

415001–415100 

|-bgcolor=#d6d6d6
| 415001 ||  || — || March 8, 2005 || Mount Lemmon || Mount Lemmon Survey || THM || align=right | 2.1 km || 
|-id=002 bgcolor=#d6d6d6
| 415002 ||  || — || November 18, 2009 || Kitt Peak || Spacewatch || — || align=right | 2.3 km || 
|-id=003 bgcolor=#d6d6d6
| 415003 ||  || — || April 2, 2006 || Kitt Peak || Spacewatch || EOS || align=right | 2.4 km || 
|-id=004 bgcolor=#E9E9E9
| 415004 ||  || — || April 19, 2007 || Mount Lemmon || Mount Lemmon Survey || DOR || align=right | 2.0 km || 
|-id=005 bgcolor=#E9E9E9
| 415005 ||  || — || December 1, 2005 || Socorro || LINEAR || — || align=right | 2.1 km || 
|-id=006 bgcolor=#d6d6d6
| 415006 ||  || — || April 26, 2006 || Anderson Mesa || LONEOS || — || align=right | 4.1 km || 
|-id=007 bgcolor=#d6d6d6
| 415007 ||  || — || November 30, 2008 || Mount Lemmon || Mount Lemmon Survey || 7:4 || align=right | 4.1 km || 
|-id=008 bgcolor=#d6d6d6
| 415008 ||  || — || April 2, 2006 || Kitt Peak || Spacewatch || — || align=right | 2.0 km || 
|-id=009 bgcolor=#d6d6d6
| 415009 ||  || — || March 15, 2010 || WISE || WISE || — || align=right | 3.5 km || 
|-id=010 bgcolor=#d6d6d6
| 415010 ||  || — || October 6, 2008 || Kitt Peak || Spacewatch || EUP || align=right | 3.5 km || 
|-id=011 bgcolor=#d6d6d6
| 415011 ||  || — || September 23, 2008 || Kitt Peak || Spacewatch || LIX || align=right | 5.0 km || 
|-id=012 bgcolor=#d6d6d6
| 415012 ||  || — || September 24, 2008 || Mount Lemmon || Mount Lemmon Survey || URS || align=right | 2.7 km || 
|-id=013 bgcolor=#d6d6d6
| 415013 ||  || — || November 24, 2003 || Kitt Peak || Spacewatch || — || align=right | 4.2 km || 
|-id=014 bgcolor=#d6d6d6
| 415014 ||  || — || October 23, 2008 || Kitt Peak || Spacewatch || — || align=right | 3.0 km || 
|-id=015 bgcolor=#d6d6d6
| 415015 ||  || — || October 23, 2003 || Kitt Peak || Spacewatch || — || align=right | 2.7 km || 
|-id=016 bgcolor=#d6d6d6
| 415016 ||  || — || October 7, 2008 || Mount Lemmon || Mount Lemmon Survey || — || align=right | 2.9 km || 
|-id=017 bgcolor=#d6d6d6
| 415017 ||  || — || April 26, 2011 || Kitt Peak || Spacewatch || 3:2 || align=right | 4.5 km || 
|-id=018 bgcolor=#d6d6d6
| 415018 ||  || — || November 21, 2003 || Kitt Peak || Spacewatch || EUP || align=right | 2.7 km || 
|-id=019 bgcolor=#d6d6d6
| 415019 ||  || — || August 23, 2007 || Kitt Peak || Spacewatch || 7:4 || align=right | 3.5 km || 
|-id=020 bgcolor=#d6d6d6
| 415020 ||  || — || December 31, 2008 || Mount Lemmon || Mount Lemmon Survey || — || align=right | 4.9 km || 
|-id=021 bgcolor=#d6d6d6
| 415021 ||  || — || March 4, 2005 || Catalina || CSS || — || align=right | 3.4 km || 
|-id=022 bgcolor=#fefefe
| 415022 ||  || — || June 26, 2011 || Mount Lemmon || Mount Lemmon Survey || H || align=right data-sort-value="0.74" | 740 m || 
|-id=023 bgcolor=#C2FFFF
| 415023 ||  || — || January 27, 2006 || Kitt Peak || Spacewatch || L5 || align=right | 8.6 km || 
|-id=024 bgcolor=#fefefe
| 415024 ||  || — || November 19, 2000 || Socorro || LINEAR || H || align=right | 1.1 km || 
|-id=025 bgcolor=#FA8072
| 415025 ||  || — || July 25, 2008 || Mount Lemmon || Mount Lemmon Survey || — || align=right data-sort-value="0.61" | 610 m || 
|-id=026 bgcolor=#C2FFFF
| 415026 ||  || — || March 28, 2008 || Mount Lemmon || Mount Lemmon Survey || L5 || align=right | 9.4 km || 
|-id=027 bgcolor=#FFC2E0
| 415027 ||  || — || September 18, 2011 || Catalina || CSS || APO || align=right data-sort-value="0.75" | 750 m || 
|-id=028 bgcolor=#fefefe
| 415028 ||  || — || March 9, 2007 || Kitt Peak || Spacewatch || — || align=right data-sort-value="0.83" | 830 m || 
|-id=029 bgcolor=#FFC2E0
| 415029 ||  || — || October 17, 2011 || Catalina || CSS || APO +1kmPHA || align=right | 2.3 km || 
|-id=030 bgcolor=#fefefe
| 415030 ||  || — || September 29, 2011 || Mount Lemmon || Mount Lemmon Survey || — || align=right | 1.0 km || 
|-id=031 bgcolor=#fefefe
| 415031 ||  || — || February 27, 2010 || WISE || WISE || — || align=right | 1.4 km || 
|-id=032 bgcolor=#fefefe
| 415032 ||  || — || December 25, 2005 || Kitt Peak || Spacewatch || — || align=right data-sort-value="0.66" | 660 m || 
|-id=033 bgcolor=#fefefe
| 415033 ||  || — || March 5, 2006 || Kitt Peak || Spacewatch || — || align=right data-sort-value="0.72" | 720 m || 
|-id=034 bgcolor=#fefefe
| 415034 ||  || — || December 30, 2008 || Kitt Peak || Spacewatch || — || align=right data-sort-value="0.53" | 530 m || 
|-id=035 bgcolor=#fefefe
| 415035 ||  || — || October 19, 2007 || Catalina || CSS || — || align=right | 1.0 km || 
|-id=036 bgcolor=#fefefe
| 415036 ||  || — || November 27, 2011 || Mount Lemmon || Mount Lemmon Survey || — || align=right data-sort-value="0.81" | 810 m || 
|-id=037 bgcolor=#fefefe
| 415037 ||  || — || October 4, 2004 || Kitt Peak || Spacewatch || — || align=right data-sort-value="0.81" | 810 m || 
|-id=038 bgcolor=#fefefe
| 415038 ||  || — || October 8, 2004 || Kitt Peak || Spacewatch || — || align=right data-sort-value="0.75" | 750 m || 
|-id=039 bgcolor=#fefefe
| 415039 ||  || — || April 12, 2005 || Mount Lemmon || Mount Lemmon Survey || NYS || align=right data-sort-value="0.78" | 780 m || 
|-id=040 bgcolor=#fefefe
| 415040 ||  || — || December 16, 2007 || Kitt Peak || Spacewatch || — || align=right data-sort-value="0.78" | 780 m || 
|-id=041 bgcolor=#fefefe
| 415041 ||  || — || November 14, 2007 || Mount Lemmon || Mount Lemmon Survey || — || align=right | 1.1 km || 
|-id=042 bgcolor=#fefefe
| 415042 ||  || — || October 12, 2007 || Kitt Peak || Spacewatch || MAS || align=right data-sort-value="0.60" | 600 m || 
|-id=043 bgcolor=#fefefe
| 415043 ||  || — || November 16, 2007 || Mount Lemmon || Mount Lemmon Survey || V || align=right data-sort-value="0.64" | 640 m || 
|-id=044 bgcolor=#fefefe
| 415044 ||  || — || December 13, 2004 || Kitt Peak || Spacewatch || V || align=right data-sort-value="0.59" | 590 m || 
|-id=045 bgcolor=#fefefe
| 415045 ||  || — || November 3, 2007 || Mount Lemmon || Mount Lemmon Survey || — || align=right data-sort-value="0.95" | 950 m || 
|-id=046 bgcolor=#fefefe
| 415046 ||  || — || February 9, 2005 || Anderson Mesa || LONEOS || — || align=right data-sort-value="0.89" | 890 m || 
|-id=047 bgcolor=#fefefe
| 415047 ||  || — || October 14, 2007 || Mount Lemmon || Mount Lemmon Survey || MAS || align=right data-sort-value="0.62" | 620 m || 
|-id=048 bgcolor=#fefefe
| 415048 ||  || — || October 8, 2004 || Kitt Peak || Spacewatch || — || align=right data-sort-value="0.64" | 640 m || 
|-id=049 bgcolor=#fefefe
| 415049 ||  || — || October 7, 2004 || Kitt Peak || Spacewatch || — || align=right data-sort-value="0.74" | 740 m || 
|-id=050 bgcolor=#fefefe
| 415050 ||  || — || November 11, 2004 || Kitt Peak || Spacewatch || — || align=right data-sort-value="0.64" | 640 m || 
|-id=051 bgcolor=#fefefe
| 415051 ||  || — || October 23, 2003 || Kitt Peak || Spacewatch || — || align=right data-sort-value="0.94" | 940 m || 
|-id=052 bgcolor=#fefefe
| 415052 ||  || — || November 7, 2007 || Kitt Peak || Spacewatch || V || align=right data-sort-value="0.87" | 870 m || 
|-id=053 bgcolor=#fefefe
| 415053 ||  || — || December 22, 2004 || Catalina || CSS || — || align=right | 1.0 km || 
|-id=054 bgcolor=#fefefe
| 415054 ||  || — || December 30, 2011 || Kitt Peak || Spacewatch || V || align=right data-sort-value="0.57" | 570 m || 
|-id=055 bgcolor=#fefefe
| 415055 ||  || — || May 8, 2005 || Mount Lemmon || Mount Lemmon Survey || — || align=right data-sort-value="0.90" | 900 m || 
|-id=056 bgcolor=#fefefe
| 415056 ||  || — || March 11, 1997 || Kitt Peak || Spacewatch || — || align=right data-sort-value="0.76" | 760 m || 
|-id=057 bgcolor=#fefefe
| 415057 ||  || — || December 18, 2004 || Mount Lemmon || Mount Lemmon Survey || — || align=right data-sort-value="0.74" | 740 m || 
|-id=058 bgcolor=#E9E9E9
| 415058 ||  || — || October 3, 2006 || Mount Lemmon || Mount Lemmon Survey || — || align=right | 1.2 km || 
|-id=059 bgcolor=#fefefe
| 415059 ||  || — || March 23, 2009 || XuYi || PMO NEO || — || align=right data-sort-value="0.89" | 890 m || 
|-id=060 bgcolor=#fefefe
| 415060 ||  || — || January 6, 2005 || Catalina || CSS || — || align=right data-sort-value="0.81" | 810 m || 
|-id=061 bgcolor=#fefefe
| 415061 ||  || — || December 18, 2007 || Kitt Peak || Spacewatch || — || align=right data-sort-value="0.72" | 720 m || 
|-id=062 bgcolor=#fefefe
| 415062 ||  || — || November 20, 2003 || Socorro || LINEAR || NYS || align=right data-sort-value="0.94" | 940 m || 
|-id=063 bgcolor=#fefefe
| 415063 ||  || — || October 12, 2007 || Kitt Peak || Spacewatch || — || align=right data-sort-value="0.63" | 630 m || 
|-id=064 bgcolor=#fefefe
| 415064 ||  || — || August 20, 2010 || XuYi || PMO NEO || — || align=right | 1.1 km || 
|-id=065 bgcolor=#fefefe
| 415065 ||  || — || January 11, 2008 || Mount Lemmon || Mount Lemmon Survey || — || align=right data-sort-value="0.82" | 820 m || 
|-id=066 bgcolor=#fefefe
| 415066 ||  || — || December 4, 2007 || Kitt Peak || Spacewatch || MAS || align=right data-sort-value="0.79" | 790 m || 
|-id=067 bgcolor=#fefefe
| 415067 ||  || — || November 3, 2007 || Mount Lemmon || Mount Lemmon Survey || — || align=right data-sort-value="0.78" | 780 m || 
|-id=068 bgcolor=#fefefe
| 415068 ||  || — || April 4, 2005 || Catalina || CSS || — || align=right data-sort-value="0.75" | 750 m || 
|-id=069 bgcolor=#fefefe
| 415069 ||  || — || September 28, 2003 || Kitt Peak || Spacewatch || — || align=right | 1.0 km || 
|-id=070 bgcolor=#fefefe
| 415070 ||  || — || November 20, 2003 || Socorro || LINEAR || — || align=right data-sort-value="0.77" | 770 m || 
|-id=071 bgcolor=#fefefe
| 415071 ||  || — || November 30, 2003 || Kitt Peak || Spacewatch || — || align=right | 1.1 km || 
|-id=072 bgcolor=#fefefe
| 415072 ||  || — || October 15, 2007 || Mount Lemmon || Mount Lemmon Survey || — || align=right data-sort-value="0.70" | 700 m || 
|-id=073 bgcolor=#fefefe
| 415073 ||  || — || January 4, 2012 || Mount Lemmon || Mount Lemmon Survey || — || align=right data-sort-value="0.74" | 740 m || 
|-id=074 bgcolor=#E9E9E9
| 415074 ||  || — || January 10, 2008 || Mount Lemmon || Mount Lemmon Survey || — || align=right data-sort-value="0.74" | 740 m || 
|-id=075 bgcolor=#fefefe
| 415075 ||  || — || November 19, 2004 || Catalina || CSS || — || align=right data-sort-value="0.56" | 560 m || 
|-id=076 bgcolor=#fefefe
| 415076 ||  || — || September 13, 2007 || Mount Lemmon || Mount Lemmon Survey || — || align=right data-sort-value="0.63" | 630 m || 
|-id=077 bgcolor=#fefefe
| 415077 ||  || — || December 18, 2004 || Mount Lemmon || Mount Lemmon Survey || — || align=right data-sort-value="0.69" | 690 m || 
|-id=078 bgcolor=#E9E9E9
| 415078 ||  || — || September 28, 2006 || Mount Lemmon || Mount Lemmon Survey || — || align=right data-sort-value="0.94" | 940 m || 
|-id=079 bgcolor=#fefefe
| 415079 ||  || — || March 26, 2009 || Mount Lemmon || Mount Lemmon Survey || V || align=right data-sort-value="0.68" | 680 m || 
|-id=080 bgcolor=#fefefe
| 415080 ||  || — || March 10, 2005 || Mount Lemmon || Mount Lemmon Survey || — || align=right data-sort-value="0.81" | 810 m || 
|-id=081 bgcolor=#fefefe
| 415081 ||  || — || December 31, 2000 || Kitt Peak || Spacewatch || — || align=right data-sort-value="0.82" | 820 m || 
|-id=082 bgcolor=#fefefe
| 415082 ||  || — || April 7, 2005 || Anderson Mesa || LONEOS || — || align=right data-sort-value="0.98" | 980 m || 
|-id=083 bgcolor=#E9E9E9
| 415083 ||  || — || February 2, 2008 || Kitt Peak || Spacewatch || — || align=right data-sort-value="0.99" | 990 m || 
|-id=084 bgcolor=#fefefe
| 415084 ||  || — || December 15, 2003 || Kitt Peak || Spacewatch || — || align=right data-sort-value="0.92" | 920 m || 
|-id=085 bgcolor=#fefefe
| 415085 ||  || — || December 4, 2007 || Mount Lemmon || Mount Lemmon Survey || — || align=right data-sort-value="0.87" | 870 m || 
|-id=086 bgcolor=#fefefe
| 415086 ||  || — || November 9, 2007 || Kitt Peak || Spacewatch || — || align=right data-sort-value="0.65" | 650 m || 
|-id=087 bgcolor=#E9E9E9
| 415087 ||  || — || March 1, 2008 || Kitt Peak || Spacewatch || — || align=right | 1.6 km || 
|-id=088 bgcolor=#fefefe
| 415088 ||  || — || October 14, 2007 || Mount Lemmon || Mount Lemmon Survey || — || align=right data-sort-value="0.67" | 670 m || 
|-id=089 bgcolor=#fefefe
| 415089 ||  || — || January 20, 2012 || Kitt Peak || Spacewatch || — || align=right data-sort-value="0.91" | 910 m || 
|-id=090 bgcolor=#fefefe
| 415090 ||  || — || March 11, 2005 || Mount Lemmon || Mount Lemmon Survey || — || align=right data-sort-value="0.89" | 890 m || 
|-id=091 bgcolor=#fefefe
| 415091 ||  || — || November 4, 2007 || Kitt Peak || Spacewatch || MAS || align=right data-sort-value="0.66" | 660 m || 
|-id=092 bgcolor=#fefefe
| 415092 ||  || — || October 20, 2007 || Mount Lemmon || Mount Lemmon Survey || — || align=right data-sort-value="0.88" | 880 m || 
|-id=093 bgcolor=#fefefe
| 415093 ||  || — || January 18, 2012 || Kitt Peak || Spacewatch || — || align=right data-sort-value="0.87" | 870 m || 
|-id=094 bgcolor=#E9E9E9
| 415094 ||  || — || December 12, 2006 || Kitt Peak || Spacewatch || — || align=right | 1.8 km || 
|-id=095 bgcolor=#fefefe
| 415095 ||  || — || January 7, 2005 || Kitt Peak || Spacewatch || — || align=right data-sort-value="0.86" | 860 m || 
|-id=096 bgcolor=#fefefe
| 415096 ||  || — || March 10, 2005 || Anderson Mesa || LONEOS || — || align=right | 1.0 km || 
|-id=097 bgcolor=#fefefe
| 415097 ||  || — || September 11, 2010 || Catalina || CSS || V || align=right data-sort-value="0.80" | 800 m || 
|-id=098 bgcolor=#fefefe
| 415098 ||  || — || December 4, 2007 || Kitt Peak || Spacewatch || — || align=right data-sort-value="0.82" | 820 m || 
|-id=099 bgcolor=#fefefe
| 415099 ||  || — || October 23, 2007 || Kitt Peak || Spacewatch || — || align=right data-sort-value="0.54" | 540 m || 
|-id=100 bgcolor=#fefefe
| 415100 ||  || — || November 15, 2007 || Mount Lemmon || Mount Lemmon Survey || — || align=right data-sort-value="0.86" | 860 m || 
|}

415101–415200 

|-bgcolor=#E9E9E9
| 415101 ||  || — || February 2, 2008 || Mount Lemmon || Mount Lemmon Survey || — || align=right | 1.7 km || 
|-id=102 bgcolor=#E9E9E9
| 415102 ||  || — || January 21, 2012 || Kitt Peak || Spacewatch || KON || align=right | 2.2 km || 
|-id=103 bgcolor=#fefefe
| 415103 ||  || — || October 21, 2007 || Mount Lemmon || Mount Lemmon Survey || — || align=right data-sort-value="0.80" | 800 m || 
|-id=104 bgcolor=#E9E9E9
| 415104 ||  || — || November 13, 2010 || Mount Lemmon || Mount Lemmon Survey || — || align=right | 1.7 km || 
|-id=105 bgcolor=#E9E9E9
| 415105 ||  || — || January 19, 2008 || Mount Lemmon || Mount Lemmon Survey || — || align=right | 1.4 km || 
|-id=106 bgcolor=#fefefe
| 415106 ||  || — || September 23, 2006 || Kitt Peak || Spacewatch || — || align=right data-sort-value="0.82" | 820 m || 
|-id=107 bgcolor=#fefefe
| 415107 ||  || — || January 4, 2012 || Mount Lemmon || Mount Lemmon Survey || — || align=right | 1.00 km || 
|-id=108 bgcolor=#fefefe
| 415108 ||  || — || December 11, 2004 || Socorro || LINEAR || — || align=right data-sort-value="0.74" | 740 m || 
|-id=109 bgcolor=#fefefe
| 415109 ||  || — || December 4, 2007 || Mount Lemmon || Mount Lemmon Survey || — || align=right data-sort-value="0.79" | 790 m || 
|-id=110 bgcolor=#E9E9E9
| 415110 ||  || — || January 27, 2012 || Kitt Peak || Spacewatch || — || align=right | 2.8 km || 
|-id=111 bgcolor=#fefefe
| 415111 ||  || — || March 1, 2005 || Kitt Peak || Spacewatch || — || align=right data-sort-value="0.60" | 600 m || 
|-id=112 bgcolor=#fefefe
| 415112 ||  || — || December 18, 2007 || Mount Lemmon || Mount Lemmon Survey || NYS || align=right data-sort-value="0.63" | 630 m || 
|-id=113 bgcolor=#fefefe
| 415113 ||  || — || March 10, 2005 || Mount Lemmon || Mount Lemmon Survey || — || align=right data-sort-value="0.81" | 810 m || 
|-id=114 bgcolor=#fefefe
| 415114 ||  || — || October 18, 2003 || Kitt Peak || Spacewatch || — || align=right data-sort-value="0.75" | 750 m || 
|-id=115 bgcolor=#fefefe
| 415115 ||  || — || November 8, 2007 || Kitt Peak || Spacewatch || V || align=right data-sort-value="0.65" | 650 m || 
|-id=116 bgcolor=#fefefe
| 415116 ||  || — || November 4, 2004 || Kitt Peak || Spacewatch || — || align=right data-sort-value="0.68" | 680 m || 
|-id=117 bgcolor=#E9E9E9
| 415117 ||  || — || October 30, 2010 || Mount Lemmon || Mount Lemmon Survey || — || align=right | 1.7 km || 
|-id=118 bgcolor=#fefefe
| 415118 ||  || — || November 2, 2007 || Kitt Peak || Spacewatch || — || align=right data-sort-value="0.60" | 600 m || 
|-id=119 bgcolor=#d6d6d6
| 415119 ||  || — || February 27, 2006 || Catalina || CSS || — || align=right | 4.5 km || 
|-id=120 bgcolor=#fefefe
| 415120 ||  || — || March 8, 2005 || Mount Lemmon || Mount Lemmon Survey || MAS || align=right data-sort-value="0.83" | 830 m || 
|-id=121 bgcolor=#E9E9E9
| 415121 ||  || — || March 26, 2008 || Kitt Peak || Spacewatch || — || align=right | 1.6 km || 
|-id=122 bgcolor=#fefefe
| 415122 ||  || — || November 28, 1999 || Kitt Peak || Spacewatch || — || align=right data-sort-value="0.90" | 900 m || 
|-id=123 bgcolor=#E9E9E9
| 415123 ||  || — || September 17, 2006 || Kitt Peak || Spacewatch || — || align=right data-sort-value="0.75" | 750 m || 
|-id=124 bgcolor=#E9E9E9
| 415124 ||  || — || April 29, 2008 || Mount Lemmon || Mount Lemmon Survey || — || align=right | 1.7 km || 
|-id=125 bgcolor=#d6d6d6
| 415125 ||  || — || February 21, 2007 || Kitt Peak || Spacewatch || — || align=right | 2.7 km || 
|-id=126 bgcolor=#fefefe
| 415126 ||  || — || September 21, 2003 || Kitt Peak || Spacewatch || — || align=right data-sort-value="0.85" | 850 m || 
|-id=127 bgcolor=#E9E9E9
| 415127 ||  || — || April 3, 2008 || Kitt Peak || Spacewatch || MIS || align=right | 2.7 km || 
|-id=128 bgcolor=#d6d6d6
| 415128 ||  || — || March 12, 2007 || Kitt Peak || Spacewatch || — || align=right | 2.7 km || 
|-id=129 bgcolor=#E9E9E9
| 415129 ||  || — || November 1, 2006 || Kitt Peak || Spacewatch || — || align=right data-sort-value="0.82" | 820 m || 
|-id=130 bgcolor=#d6d6d6
| 415130 ||  || — || September 28, 2009 || Mount Lemmon || Mount Lemmon Survey || — || align=right | 3.7 km || 
|-id=131 bgcolor=#E9E9E9
| 415131 ||  || — || March 1, 2008 || Kitt Peak || Spacewatch || HNS || align=right | 1.3 km || 
|-id=132 bgcolor=#fefefe
| 415132 ||  || — || April 19, 1994 || Kitt Peak || Spacewatch || — || align=right data-sort-value="0.68" | 680 m || 
|-id=133 bgcolor=#E9E9E9
| 415133 ||  || — || May 5, 2008 || Mount Lemmon || Mount Lemmon Survey || — || align=right | 1.4 km || 
|-id=134 bgcolor=#E9E9E9
| 415134 ||  || — || April 14, 2008 || Kitt Peak || Spacewatch || — || align=right | 1.1 km || 
|-id=135 bgcolor=#FA8072
| 415135 ||  || — || September 3, 2007 || Catalina || CSS || — || align=right data-sort-value="0.60" | 600 m || 
|-id=136 bgcolor=#fefefe
| 415136 ||  || — || December 1, 2003 || Kitt Peak || Spacewatch || — || align=right data-sort-value="0.75" | 750 m || 
|-id=137 bgcolor=#E9E9E9
| 415137 ||  || — || April 15, 2008 || Kitt Peak || Spacewatch || — || align=right | 1.6 km || 
|-id=138 bgcolor=#fefefe
| 415138 ||  || — || October 23, 2003 || Anderson Mesa || LONEOS || — || align=right data-sort-value="0.99" | 990 m || 
|-id=139 bgcolor=#fefefe
| 415139 ||  || — || January 17, 2008 || Mount Lemmon || Mount Lemmon Survey || — || align=right data-sort-value="0.80" | 800 m || 
|-id=140 bgcolor=#d6d6d6
| 415140 ||  || — || October 15, 2009 || Mount Lemmon || Mount Lemmon Survey || — || align=right | 4.2 km || 
|-id=141 bgcolor=#E9E9E9
| 415141 ||  || — || November 6, 2010 || Mount Lemmon || Mount Lemmon Survey || — || align=right | 1.3 km || 
|-id=142 bgcolor=#E9E9E9
| 415142 ||  || — || January 10, 2007 || Mount Lemmon || Mount Lemmon Survey || MRX || align=right | 1.1 km || 
|-id=143 bgcolor=#fefefe
| 415143 ||  || — || December 18, 2007 || Kitt Peak || Spacewatch || — || align=right data-sort-value="0.79" | 790 m || 
|-id=144 bgcolor=#fefefe
| 415144 ||  || — || August 27, 2006 || Kitt Peak || Spacewatch || V || align=right data-sort-value="0.69" | 690 m || 
|-id=145 bgcolor=#E9E9E9
| 415145 ||  || — || April 28, 2008 || Mount Lemmon || Mount Lemmon Survey || — || align=right | 1.3 km || 
|-id=146 bgcolor=#E9E9E9
| 415146 ||  || — || February 1, 2012 || Kitt Peak || Spacewatch || — || align=right | 1.4 km || 
|-id=147 bgcolor=#E9E9E9
| 415147 ||  || — || October 13, 2006 || Kitt Peak || Spacewatch || (5) || align=right data-sort-value="0.77" | 770 m || 
|-id=148 bgcolor=#d6d6d6
| 415148 ||  || — || April 9, 2007 || Kitt Peak || Spacewatch || — || align=right | 4.8 km || 
|-id=149 bgcolor=#fefefe
| 415149 ||  || — || March 10, 2005 || Mount Lemmon || Mount Lemmon Survey || MAS || align=right data-sort-value="0.62" | 620 m || 
|-id=150 bgcolor=#E9E9E9
| 415150 ||  || — || December 12, 2006 || Kitt Peak || Spacewatch || — || align=right | 2.0 km || 
|-id=151 bgcolor=#E9E9E9
| 415151 ||  || — || October 1, 2005 || Catalina || CSS || — || align=right | 1.6 km || 
|-id=152 bgcolor=#d6d6d6
| 415152 ||  || — || October 23, 2009 || Mount Lemmon || Mount Lemmon Survey || — || align=right | 2.6 km || 
|-id=153 bgcolor=#E9E9E9
| 415153 ||  || — || November 1, 2005 || Kitt Peak || Spacewatch || — || align=right | 2.0 km || 
|-id=154 bgcolor=#E9E9E9
| 415154 ||  || — || September 23, 2005 || Kitt Peak || Spacewatch || — || align=right | 1.8 km || 
|-id=155 bgcolor=#E9E9E9
| 415155 ||  || — || April 6, 2008 || Kitt Peak || Spacewatch || — || align=right | 1.7 km || 
|-id=156 bgcolor=#E9E9E9
| 415156 ||  || — || February 1, 2012 || Mount Lemmon || Mount Lemmon Survey || HNS || align=right | 1.1 km || 
|-id=157 bgcolor=#E9E9E9
| 415157 ||  || — || February 19, 2007 || Mount Lemmon || Mount Lemmon Survey || — || align=right | 2.1 km || 
|-id=158 bgcolor=#E9E9E9
| 415158 ||  || — || October 30, 2005 || Kitt Peak || Spacewatch || WIT || align=right data-sort-value="0.90" | 900 m || 
|-id=159 bgcolor=#E9E9E9
| 415159 ||  || — || March 6, 2003 || Anderson Mesa || LONEOS || — || align=right | 1.9 km || 
|-id=160 bgcolor=#E9E9E9
| 415160 ||  || — || October 1, 2005 || Mount Lemmon || Mount Lemmon Survey || — || align=right | 2.1 km || 
|-id=161 bgcolor=#E9E9E9
| 415161 ||  || — || December 25, 2010 || Mount Lemmon || Mount Lemmon Survey || — || align=right | 2.0 km || 
|-id=162 bgcolor=#fefefe
| 415162 ||  || — || February 11, 2008 || Mount Lemmon || Mount Lemmon Survey || — || align=right data-sort-value="0.96" | 960 m || 
|-id=163 bgcolor=#E9E9E9
| 415163 ||  || — || November 6, 2010 || Kitt Peak || Spacewatch || — || align=right | 1.8 km || 
|-id=164 bgcolor=#d6d6d6
| 415164 ||  || — || October 10, 1993 || Kitt Peak || Spacewatch || EOS || align=right | 1.9 km || 
|-id=165 bgcolor=#fefefe
| 415165 ||  || — || February 16, 2001 || Kitt Peak || Spacewatch || — || align=right data-sort-value="0.77" | 770 m || 
|-id=166 bgcolor=#fefefe
| 415166 ||  || — || December 19, 2003 || Kitt Peak || Spacewatch || NYS || align=right data-sort-value="0.61" | 610 m || 
|-id=167 bgcolor=#E9E9E9
| 415167 ||  || — || October 1, 2005 || Kitt Peak || Spacewatch || — || align=right | 2.0 km || 
|-id=168 bgcolor=#d6d6d6
| 415168 ||  || — || February 2, 2006 || Kitt Peak || Spacewatch || — || align=right | 2.9 km || 
|-id=169 bgcolor=#d6d6d6
| 415169 ||  || — || January 3, 2011 || Mount Lemmon || Mount Lemmon Survey || — || align=right | 2.5 km || 
|-id=170 bgcolor=#fefefe
| 415170 ||  || — || December 13, 1999 || Kitt Peak || Spacewatch || MAS || align=right data-sort-value="0.61" | 610 m || 
|-id=171 bgcolor=#fefefe
| 415171 ||  || — || January 18, 2008 || Mount Lemmon || Mount Lemmon Survey || NYS || align=right data-sort-value="0.62" | 620 m || 
|-id=172 bgcolor=#fefefe
| 415172 ||  || — || October 2, 2010 || Kitt Peak || Spacewatch || — || align=right data-sort-value="0.82" | 820 m || 
|-id=173 bgcolor=#d6d6d6
| 415173 ||  || — || March 12, 2007 || Catalina || CSS || — || align=right | 3.8 km || 
|-id=174 bgcolor=#E9E9E9
| 415174 ||  || — || September 30, 2005 || Mount Lemmon || Mount Lemmon Survey || — || align=right | 1.5 km || 
|-id=175 bgcolor=#E9E9E9
| 415175 ||  || — || March 15, 2008 || Mount Lemmon || Mount Lemmon Survey || — || align=right | 1.6 km || 
|-id=176 bgcolor=#E9E9E9
| 415176 ||  || — || October 11, 2005 || Kitt Peak || Spacewatch || — || align=right | 2.0 km || 
|-id=177 bgcolor=#fefefe
| 415177 ||  || — || December 19, 2003 || Kitt Peak || Spacewatch || — || align=right data-sort-value="0.98" | 980 m || 
|-id=178 bgcolor=#E9E9E9
| 415178 ||  || — || February 10, 2008 || Mount Lemmon || Mount Lemmon Survey || HNS || align=right | 1.5 km || 
|-id=179 bgcolor=#d6d6d6
| 415179 ||  || — || September 18, 2003 || Kitt Peak || Spacewatch || — || align=right | 4.0 km || 
|-id=180 bgcolor=#E9E9E9
| 415180 ||  || — || February 9, 2007 || Catalina || CSS || — || align=right | 3.6 km || 
|-id=181 bgcolor=#d6d6d6
| 415181 ||  || — || February 17, 2010 || WISE || WISE || — || align=right | 4.3 km || 
|-id=182 bgcolor=#E9E9E9
| 415182 ||  || — || September 29, 2005 || Mount Lemmon || Mount Lemmon Survey || (1547) || align=right | 1.9 km || 
|-id=183 bgcolor=#E9E9E9
| 415183 ||  || — || January 5, 2003 || Socorro || LINEAR || — || align=right | 1.7 km || 
|-id=184 bgcolor=#d6d6d6
| 415184 ||  || — || March 12, 2007 || Kitt Peak || Spacewatch || — || align=right | 2.5 km || 
|-id=185 bgcolor=#E9E9E9
| 415185 ||  || — || November 13, 2010 || Mount Lemmon || Mount Lemmon Survey || — || align=right data-sort-value="0.93" | 930 m || 
|-id=186 bgcolor=#d6d6d6
| 415186 ||  || — || September 26, 2008 || Mount Lemmon || Mount Lemmon Survey || — || align=right | 3.2 km || 
|-id=187 bgcolor=#E9E9E9
| 415187 ||  || — || February 13, 2008 || Mount Lemmon || Mount Lemmon Survey || — || align=right | 1.3 km || 
|-id=188 bgcolor=#d6d6d6
| 415188 ||  || — || September 27, 2009 || Kitt Peak || Spacewatch || EOS || align=right | 1.9 km || 
|-id=189 bgcolor=#E9E9E9
| 415189 ||  || — || April 6, 2008 || Kitt Peak || Spacewatch || — || align=right | 1.3 km || 
|-id=190 bgcolor=#d6d6d6
| 415190 ||  || — || October 19, 2003 || Kitt Peak || Spacewatch || — || align=right | 3.9 km || 
|-id=191 bgcolor=#d6d6d6
| 415191 ||  || — || November 10, 2005 || Mount Lemmon || Mount Lemmon Survey || — || align=right | 2.8 km || 
|-id=192 bgcolor=#E9E9E9
| 415192 ||  || — || May 28, 2008 || Kitt Peak || Spacewatch || EUN || align=right | 1.2 km || 
|-id=193 bgcolor=#E9E9E9
| 415193 ||  || — || November 15, 2010 || Catalina || CSS || KON || align=right | 2.9 km || 
|-id=194 bgcolor=#fefefe
| 415194 ||  || — || September 26, 2006 || Kitt Peak || Spacewatch || MAS || align=right data-sort-value="0.79" | 790 m || 
|-id=195 bgcolor=#E9E9E9
| 415195 ||  || — || October 28, 2005 || Kitt Peak || Spacewatch || MRX || align=right data-sort-value="0.98" | 980 m || 
|-id=196 bgcolor=#E9E9E9
| 415196 ||  || — || November 6, 2005 || Mount Lemmon || Mount Lemmon Survey || — || align=right | 2.4 km || 
|-id=197 bgcolor=#d6d6d6
| 415197 ||  || — || March 17, 2012 || Kitt Peak || Spacewatch || — || align=right | 2.7 km || 
|-id=198 bgcolor=#d6d6d6
| 415198 ||  || — || March 28, 2012 || Kitt Peak || Spacewatch || — || align=right | 2.2 km || 
|-id=199 bgcolor=#d6d6d6
| 415199 ||  || — || February 22, 2006 || Catalina || CSS || — || align=right | 4.0 km || 
|-id=200 bgcolor=#d6d6d6
| 415200 ||  || — || January 30, 2012 || Mount Lemmon || Mount Lemmon Survey || — || align=right | 3.2 km || 
|}

415201–415300 

|-bgcolor=#E9E9E9
| 415201 ||  || — || November 14, 2010 || Kitt Peak || Spacewatch || — || align=right | 1.3 km || 
|-id=202 bgcolor=#E9E9E9
| 415202 ||  || — || April 11, 2003 || Kitt Peak || Spacewatch || — || align=right | 2.8 km || 
|-id=203 bgcolor=#d6d6d6
| 415203 ||  || — || January 4, 2010 || Kitt Peak || Spacewatch || — || align=right | 3.5 km || 
|-id=204 bgcolor=#d6d6d6
| 415204 ||  || — || January 27, 2010 || WISE || WISE || EOS || align=right | 4.0 km || 
|-id=205 bgcolor=#d6d6d6
| 415205 ||  || — || April 18, 2012 || Kitt Peak || Spacewatch || VER || align=right | 3.0 km || 
|-id=206 bgcolor=#E9E9E9
| 415206 ||  || — || February 10, 2007 || Catalina || CSS || JUN || align=right | 1.2 km || 
|-id=207 bgcolor=#d6d6d6
| 415207 ||  || — || September 21, 2009 || Kitt Peak || Spacewatch || KOR || align=right | 1.2 km || 
|-id=208 bgcolor=#E9E9E9
| 415208 ||  || — || November 17, 2006 || Mount Lemmon || Mount Lemmon Survey || — || align=right | 1.2 km || 
|-id=209 bgcolor=#d6d6d6
| 415209 ||  || — || November 10, 2004 || Kitt Peak || Spacewatch || — || align=right | 3.0 km || 
|-id=210 bgcolor=#d6d6d6
| 415210 ||  || — || October 1, 2003 || Kitt Peak || Spacewatch || — || align=right | 2.9 km || 
|-id=211 bgcolor=#d6d6d6
| 415211 ||  || — || October 10, 2008 || Mount Lemmon || Mount Lemmon Survey || — || align=right | 3.9 km || 
|-id=212 bgcolor=#E9E9E9
| 415212 ||  || — || February 22, 2007 || Catalina || CSS || — || align=right | 2.8 km || 
|-id=213 bgcolor=#d6d6d6
| 415213 ||  || — || March 14, 2012 || Mount Lemmon || Mount Lemmon Survey || — || align=right | 4.5 km || 
|-id=214 bgcolor=#E9E9E9
| 415214 ||  || — || October 1, 2005 || Mount Lemmon || Mount Lemmon Survey || — || align=right | 1.6 km || 
|-id=215 bgcolor=#d6d6d6
| 415215 ||  || — || October 7, 2008 || Mount Lemmon || Mount Lemmon Survey || — || align=right | 3.6 km || 
|-id=216 bgcolor=#d6d6d6
| 415216 ||  || — || November 27, 2009 || Mount Lemmon || Mount Lemmon Survey || EOS || align=right | 2.3 km || 
|-id=217 bgcolor=#E9E9E9
| 415217 ||  || — || November 6, 2005 || Kitt Peak || Spacewatch || — || align=right | 2.7 km || 
|-id=218 bgcolor=#E9E9E9
| 415218 ||  || — || April 1, 2008 || Kitt Peak || Spacewatch || — || align=right | 1.0 km || 
|-id=219 bgcolor=#d6d6d6
| 415219 ||  || — || October 20, 2003 || Kitt Peak || Spacewatch || — || align=right | 4.0 km || 
|-id=220 bgcolor=#d6d6d6
| 415220 ||  || — || March 13, 2007 || Mount Lemmon || Mount Lemmon Survey || EOS || align=right | 2.4 km || 
|-id=221 bgcolor=#E9E9E9
| 415221 ||  || — || March 9, 2007 || Kitt Peak || Spacewatch || HOF || align=right | 3.1 km || 
|-id=222 bgcolor=#d6d6d6
| 415222 ||  || — || September 17, 2009 || Mount Lemmon || Mount Lemmon Survey || — || align=right | 4.6 km || 
|-id=223 bgcolor=#E9E9E9
| 415223 ||  || — || September 26, 2005 || Kitt Peak || Spacewatch || ADE || align=right | 2.4 km || 
|-id=224 bgcolor=#d6d6d6
| 415224 ||  || — || November 24, 2003 || Anderson Mesa || LONEOS || VER || align=right | 3.4 km || 
|-id=225 bgcolor=#E9E9E9
| 415225 ||  || — || May 5, 2008 || Mount Lemmon || Mount Lemmon Survey || — || align=right | 1.1 km || 
|-id=226 bgcolor=#E9E9E9
| 415226 ||  || — || February 17, 2007 || Kitt Peak || Spacewatch || — || align=right | 2.2 km || 
|-id=227 bgcolor=#E9E9E9
| 415227 ||  || — || May 22, 1998 || Kitt Peak || Spacewatch || — || align=right | 3.3 km || 
|-id=228 bgcolor=#E9E9E9
| 415228 ||  || — || November 16, 2006 || Kitt Peak || Spacewatch || — || align=right data-sort-value="0.98" | 980 m || 
|-id=229 bgcolor=#d6d6d6
| 415229 ||  || — || November 10, 2009 || Kitt Peak || Spacewatch || EOS || align=right | 2.2 km || 
|-id=230 bgcolor=#E9E9E9
| 415230 ||  || — || February 22, 2007 || Catalina || CSS || — || align=right | 2.3 km || 
|-id=231 bgcolor=#E9E9E9
| 415231 ||  || — || December 8, 2010 || Mount Lemmon || Mount Lemmon Survey || — || align=right | 2.4 km || 
|-id=232 bgcolor=#d6d6d6
| 415232 ||  || — || October 24, 2009 || Kitt Peak || Spacewatch || — || align=right | 3.3 km || 
|-id=233 bgcolor=#d6d6d6
| 415233 ||  || — || October 8, 2008 || Catalina || CSS || EOS || align=right | 2.5 km || 
|-id=234 bgcolor=#d6d6d6
| 415234 ||  || — || September 29, 2008 || Catalina || CSS || — || align=right | 3.7 km || 
|-id=235 bgcolor=#d6d6d6
| 415235 ||  || — || September 3, 2008 || Kitt Peak || Spacewatch || EOS || align=right | 1.7 km || 
|-id=236 bgcolor=#E9E9E9
| 415236 ||  || — || October 27, 2005 || Kitt Peak || Spacewatch || — || align=right | 1.3 km || 
|-id=237 bgcolor=#d6d6d6
| 415237 ||  || — || October 20, 2003 || Socorro || LINEAR || — || align=right | 3.0 km || 
|-id=238 bgcolor=#d6d6d6
| 415238 ||  || — || October 20, 2003 || Kitt Peak || Spacewatch || EOS || align=right | 2.2 km || 
|-id=239 bgcolor=#d6d6d6
| 415239 ||  || — || September 28, 2003 || Anderson Mesa || LONEOS || — || align=right | 3.4 km || 
|-id=240 bgcolor=#E9E9E9
| 415240 ||  || — || March 27, 2003 || Socorro || LINEAR || ADE || align=right | 2.5 km || 
|-id=241 bgcolor=#d6d6d6
| 415241 ||  || — || November 22, 2009 || Kitt Peak || Spacewatch || — || align=right | 3.7 km || 
|-id=242 bgcolor=#d6d6d6
| 415242 ||  || — || September 29, 2008 || Mount Lemmon || Mount Lemmon Survey || TIR || align=right | 3.2 km || 
|-id=243 bgcolor=#d6d6d6
| 415243 ||  || — || November 9, 2009 || Kitt Peak || Spacewatch || — || align=right | 2.9 km || 
|-id=244 bgcolor=#d6d6d6
| 415244 ||  || — || November 30, 2005 || Mount Lemmon || Mount Lemmon Survey || — || align=right | 2.6 km || 
|-id=245 bgcolor=#d6d6d6
| 415245 ||  || — || October 12, 1999 || Kitt Peak || Spacewatch || — || align=right | 2.8 km || 
|-id=246 bgcolor=#d6d6d6
| 415246 ||  || — || November 30, 2003 || Kitt Peak || Spacewatch || (5651) || align=right | 3.6 km || 
|-id=247 bgcolor=#E9E9E9
| 415247 ||  || — || December 27, 2005 || Mount Lemmon || Mount Lemmon Survey || — || align=right | 2.5 km || 
|-id=248 bgcolor=#d6d6d6
| 415248 ||  || — || April 24, 2001 || Kitt Peak || Spacewatch || — || align=right | 2.8 km || 
|-id=249 bgcolor=#d6d6d6
| 415249 ||  || — || November 21, 2009 || Kitt Peak || Spacewatch || VER || align=right | 2.8 km || 
|-id=250 bgcolor=#d6d6d6
| 415250 ||  || — || November 30, 2003 || Kitt Peak || Spacewatch || — || align=right | 3.1 km || 
|-id=251 bgcolor=#d6d6d6
| 415251 ||  || — || February 23, 2011 || Kitt Peak || Spacewatch || — || align=right | 2.7 km || 
|-id=252 bgcolor=#d6d6d6
| 415252 ||  || — || February 2, 2006 || Kitt Peak || Spacewatch || — || align=right | 2.6 km || 
|-id=253 bgcolor=#d6d6d6
| 415253 ||  || — || November 5, 1999 || Kitt Peak || Spacewatch || KOR || align=right | 1.5 km || 
|-id=254 bgcolor=#d6d6d6
| 415254 ||  || — || January 16, 2011 || Mount Lemmon || Mount Lemmon Survey || — || align=right | 2.6 km || 
|-id=255 bgcolor=#d6d6d6
| 415255 ||  || — || September 4, 2008 || Kitt Peak || Spacewatch || — || align=right | 2.6 km || 
|-id=256 bgcolor=#d6d6d6
| 415256 ||  || — || March 14, 2007 || Kitt Peak || Spacewatch || BRA || align=right | 1.2 km || 
|-id=257 bgcolor=#E9E9E9
| 415257 ||  || — || November 19, 2006 || Kitt Peak || Spacewatch || — || align=right | 1.4 km || 
|-id=258 bgcolor=#d6d6d6
| 415258 ||  || — || February 25, 2006 || Kitt Peak || Spacewatch || — || align=right | 2.6 km || 
|-id=259 bgcolor=#E9E9E9
| 415259 ||  || — || September 29, 2005 || Mount Lemmon || Mount Lemmon Survey || — || align=right | 1.2 km || 
|-id=260 bgcolor=#d6d6d6
| 415260 ||  || — || April 20, 2007 || Kitt Peak || Spacewatch || — || align=right | 2.5 km || 
|-id=261 bgcolor=#d6d6d6
| 415261 ||  || — || September 24, 2008 || Kitt Peak || Spacewatch || — || align=right | 2.9 km || 
|-id=262 bgcolor=#d6d6d6
| 415262 ||  || — || September 22, 2008 || Kitt Peak || Spacewatch || — || align=right | 3.5 km || 
|-id=263 bgcolor=#d6d6d6
| 415263 ||  || — || March 10, 2011 || Mount Lemmon || Mount Lemmon Survey || — || align=right | 3.9 km || 
|-id=264 bgcolor=#d6d6d6
| 415264 ||  || — || April 24, 2012 || Mount Lemmon || Mount Lemmon Survey || — || align=right | 3.0 km || 
|-id=265 bgcolor=#C2FFFF
| 415265 ||  || — || March 11, 2008 || Kitt Peak || Spacewatch || L5 || align=right | 9.5 km || 
|-id=266 bgcolor=#fefefe
| 415266 ||  || — || December 21, 2012 || Mount Lemmon || Mount Lemmon Survey || H || align=right data-sort-value="0.98" | 980 m || 
|-id=267 bgcolor=#FFC2E0
| 415267 ||  || — || January 18, 2013 || Mount Lemmon || Mount Lemmon Survey || AMO || align=right data-sort-value="0.77" | 770 m || 
|-id=268 bgcolor=#fefefe
| 415268 ||  || — || September 26, 2000 || Socorro || LINEAR || — || align=right data-sort-value="0.91" | 910 m || 
|-id=269 bgcolor=#fefefe
| 415269 ||  || — || February 14, 2013 || Kitt Peak || Spacewatch || — || align=right data-sort-value="0.82" | 820 m || 
|-id=270 bgcolor=#fefefe
| 415270 ||  || — || May 29, 2000 || Kitt Peak || Spacewatch || — || align=right data-sort-value="0.72" | 720 m || 
|-id=271 bgcolor=#fefefe
| 415271 ||  || — || January 8, 2013 || Mount Lemmon || Mount Lemmon Survey || — || align=right data-sort-value="0.90" | 900 m || 
|-id=272 bgcolor=#fefefe
| 415272 ||  || — || September 11, 2007 || Kitt Peak || Spacewatch || — || align=right data-sort-value="0.60" | 600 m || 
|-id=273 bgcolor=#fefefe
| 415273 ||  || — || March 14, 2007 || Mount Lemmon || Mount Lemmon Survey || — || align=right data-sort-value="0.69" | 690 m || 
|-id=274 bgcolor=#fefefe
| 415274 ||  || — || April 6, 2010 || Mount Lemmon || Mount Lemmon Survey || — || align=right data-sort-value="0.52" | 520 m || 
|-id=275 bgcolor=#fefefe
| 415275 ||  || — || October 7, 2004 || Kitt Peak || Spacewatch || — || align=right data-sort-value="0.82" | 820 m || 
|-id=276 bgcolor=#fefefe
| 415276 ||  || — || February 10, 2003 || Kitt Peak || Spacewatch || — || align=right data-sort-value="0.83" | 830 m || 
|-id=277 bgcolor=#fefefe
| 415277 ||  || — || June 21, 2010 || Mount Lemmon || Mount Lemmon Survey || MAS || align=right data-sort-value="0.64" | 640 m || 
|-id=278 bgcolor=#fefefe
| 415278 ||  || — || March 24, 2006 || Kitt Peak || Spacewatch || — || align=right data-sort-value="0.72" | 720 m || 
|-id=279 bgcolor=#fefefe
| 415279 ||  || — || October 24, 2007 || Mount Lemmon || Mount Lemmon Survey || — || align=right data-sort-value="0.87" | 870 m || 
|-id=280 bgcolor=#fefefe
| 415280 ||  || — || September 5, 2010 || Mount Lemmon || Mount Lemmon Survey || NYS || align=right data-sort-value="0.60" | 600 m || 
|-id=281 bgcolor=#d6d6d6
| 415281 ||  || — || February 17, 2007 || Kitt Peak || Spacewatch || — || align=right | 3.4 km || 
|-id=282 bgcolor=#fefefe
| 415282 ||  || — || September 13, 2007 || Mount Lemmon || Mount Lemmon Survey || — || align=right data-sort-value="0.72" | 720 m || 
|-id=283 bgcolor=#fefefe
| 415283 ||  || — || December 25, 2005 || Kitt Peak || Spacewatch || — || align=right data-sort-value="0.64" | 640 m || 
|-id=284 bgcolor=#fefefe
| 415284 ||  || — || March 27, 2003 || Kitt Peak || Spacewatch || — || align=right data-sort-value="0.79" | 790 m || 
|-id=285 bgcolor=#fefefe
| 415285 ||  || — || March 25, 2006 || Mount Lemmon || Mount Lemmon Survey || NYS || align=right data-sort-value="0.63" | 630 m || 
|-id=286 bgcolor=#fefefe
| 415286 ||  || — || October 30, 2007 || Mount Lemmon || Mount Lemmon Survey || — || align=right data-sort-value="0.70" | 700 m || 
|-id=287 bgcolor=#fefefe
| 415287 ||  || — || February 20, 2006 || Kitt Peak || Spacewatch || — || align=right data-sort-value="0.92" | 920 m || 
|-id=288 bgcolor=#E9E9E9
| 415288 ||  || — || May 1, 2009 || Mount Lemmon || Mount Lemmon Survey || — || align=right | 1.2 km || 
|-id=289 bgcolor=#fefefe
| 415289 ||  || — || March 5, 2013 || Kitt Peak || Spacewatch || — || align=right data-sort-value="0.72" | 720 m || 
|-id=290 bgcolor=#fefefe
| 415290 ||  || — || February 1, 2009 || Kitt Peak || Spacewatch || NYS || align=right data-sort-value="0.69" | 690 m || 
|-id=291 bgcolor=#fefefe
| 415291 ||  || — || September 3, 2007 || Catalina || CSS || — || align=right data-sort-value="0.75" | 750 m || 
|-id=292 bgcolor=#fefefe
| 415292 ||  || — || September 21, 2000 || Anderson Mesa || LONEOS || — || align=right data-sort-value="0.86" | 860 m || 
|-id=293 bgcolor=#E9E9E9
| 415293 ||  || — || May 4, 2009 || Mount Lemmon || Mount Lemmon Survey || (5) || align=right data-sort-value="0.82" | 820 m || 
|-id=294 bgcolor=#fefefe
| 415294 ||  || — || May 3, 2006 || Kitt Peak || Spacewatch || — || align=right data-sort-value="0.78" | 780 m || 
|-id=295 bgcolor=#fefefe
| 415295 ||  || — || October 11, 2007 || Mount Lemmon || Mount Lemmon Survey || — || align=right data-sort-value="0.91" | 910 m || 
|-id=296 bgcolor=#fefefe
| 415296 ||  || — || March 9, 2005 || Catalina || CSS || H || align=right data-sort-value="0.78" | 780 m || 
|-id=297 bgcolor=#fefefe
| 415297 ||  || — || January 17, 2005 || Kitt Peak || Spacewatch || — || align=right | 2.6 km || 
|-id=298 bgcolor=#E9E9E9
| 415298 ||  || — || October 17, 2001 || Kitt Peak || Spacewatch || (194) || align=right | 2.0 km || 
|-id=299 bgcolor=#E9E9E9
| 415299 ||  || — || April 16, 2005 || Kitt Peak || Spacewatch || — || align=right data-sort-value="0.91" | 910 m || 
|-id=300 bgcolor=#fefefe
| 415300 ||  || — || March 23, 1995 || Kitt Peak || Spacewatch || — || align=right data-sort-value="0.66" | 660 m || 
|}

415301–415400 

|-bgcolor=#fefefe
| 415301 ||  || — || March 16, 2013 || Mount Lemmon || Mount Lemmon Survey || — || align=right data-sort-value="0.67" | 670 m || 
|-id=302 bgcolor=#fefefe
| 415302 ||  || — || February 4, 2005 || Mount Lemmon || Mount Lemmon Survey || MAS || align=right data-sort-value="0.90" | 900 m || 
|-id=303 bgcolor=#fefefe
| 415303 ||  || — || January 17, 2009 || Kitt Peak || Spacewatch || — || align=right data-sort-value="0.87" | 870 m || 
|-id=304 bgcolor=#fefefe
| 415304 ||  || — || March 3, 2009 || Mount Lemmon || Mount Lemmon Survey || V || align=right data-sort-value="0.67" | 670 m || 
|-id=305 bgcolor=#fefefe
| 415305 ||  || — || November 28, 2005 || Mount Lemmon || Mount Lemmon Survey || — || align=right data-sort-value="0.91" | 910 m || 
|-id=306 bgcolor=#fefefe
| 415306 ||  || — || March 14, 2005 || Mount Lemmon || Mount Lemmon Survey || H || align=right data-sort-value="0.79" | 790 m || 
|-id=307 bgcolor=#fefefe
| 415307 ||  || — || November 19, 2007 || Kitt Peak || Spacewatch || — || align=right data-sort-value="0.95" | 950 m || 
|-id=308 bgcolor=#E9E9E9
| 415308 ||  || — || October 9, 2010 || Kitt Peak || Spacewatch || RAF || align=right data-sort-value="0.81" | 810 m || 
|-id=309 bgcolor=#fefefe
| 415309 ||  || — || September 16, 2003 || Kitt Peak || Spacewatch || — || align=right data-sort-value="0.74" | 740 m || 
|-id=310 bgcolor=#E9E9E9
| 415310 ||  || — || October 2, 2010 || Mount Lemmon || Mount Lemmon Survey || — || align=right | 2.5 km || 
|-id=311 bgcolor=#fefefe
| 415311 ||  || — || April 20, 2006 || Kitt Peak || Spacewatch || V || align=right data-sort-value="0.61" | 610 m || 
|-id=312 bgcolor=#E9E9E9
| 415312 ||  || — || October 19, 2010 || Mount Lemmon || Mount Lemmon Survey || — || align=right | 1.7 km || 
|-id=313 bgcolor=#E9E9E9
| 415313 ||  || — || June 13, 2004 || Kitt Peak || Spacewatch || — || align=right | 2.9 km || 
|-id=314 bgcolor=#E9E9E9
| 415314 ||  || — || January 19, 2004 || Kitt Peak || Spacewatch || KON || align=right | 1.7 km || 
|-id=315 bgcolor=#fefefe
| 415315 ||  || — || April 21, 2006 || Kitt Peak || Spacewatch || — || align=right data-sort-value="0.83" | 830 m || 
|-id=316 bgcolor=#fefefe
| 415316 ||  || — || December 5, 2007 || Mount Lemmon || Mount Lemmon Survey || V || align=right data-sort-value="0.69" | 690 m || 
|-id=317 bgcolor=#E9E9E9
| 415317 ||  || — || June 11, 2004 || Socorro || LINEAR || — || align=right | 3.2 km || 
|-id=318 bgcolor=#E9E9E9
| 415318 ||  || — || November 1, 2006 || Mount Lemmon || Mount Lemmon Survey || KON || align=right | 2.3 km || 
|-id=319 bgcolor=#fefefe
| 415319 ||  || — || December 10, 1998 || Kitt Peak || Spacewatch || H || align=right | 1.0 km || 
|-id=320 bgcolor=#fefefe
| 415320 ||  || — || March 9, 2005 || Kitt Peak || Spacewatch || — || align=right data-sort-value="0.98" | 980 m || 
|-id=321 bgcolor=#fefefe
| 415321 ||  || — || November 28, 1999 || Kitt Peak || Spacewatch || — || align=right data-sort-value="0.98" | 980 m || 
|-id=322 bgcolor=#fefefe
| 415322 ||  || — || January 14, 2002 || Kitt Peak || Spacewatch || — || align=right data-sort-value="0.69" | 690 m || 
|-id=323 bgcolor=#d6d6d6
| 415323 ||  || — || March 11, 2008 || Mount Lemmon || Mount Lemmon Survey || critical || align=right | 2.2 km || 
|-id=324 bgcolor=#E9E9E9
| 415324 ||  || — || April 25, 2000 || Anderson Mesa || LONEOS || JUN || align=right | 1.1 km || 
|-id=325 bgcolor=#fefefe
| 415325 ||  || — || May 31, 2006 || Mount Lemmon || Mount Lemmon Survey || MAS || align=right data-sort-value="0.90" | 900 m || 
|-id=326 bgcolor=#fefefe
| 415326 ||  || — || September 19, 2003 || Kitt Peak || Spacewatch || NYS || align=right data-sort-value="0.59" | 590 m || 
|-id=327 bgcolor=#fefefe
| 415327 ||  || — || October 15, 2007 || Kitt Peak || Spacewatch || — || align=right | 2.4 km || 
|-id=328 bgcolor=#fefefe
| 415328 ||  || — || November 20, 2004 || Kitt Peak || Spacewatch || — || align=right data-sort-value="0.74" | 740 m || 
|-id=329 bgcolor=#fefefe
| 415329 ||  || — || September 18, 2003 || Kitt Peak || Spacewatch || V || align=right data-sort-value="0.49" | 490 m || 
|-id=330 bgcolor=#fefefe
| 415330 ||  || — || September 18, 2003 || Kitt Peak || Spacewatch || V || align=right data-sort-value="0.46" | 460 m || 
|-id=331 bgcolor=#fefefe
| 415331 ||  || — || May 10, 2002 || Kitt Peak || Spacewatch || — || align=right | 2.1 km || 
|-id=332 bgcolor=#d6d6d6
| 415332 ||  || — || October 5, 2004 || Kitt Peak || Spacewatch || — || align=right | 2.0 km || 
|-id=333 bgcolor=#fefefe
| 415333 ||  || — || September 30, 2003 || Kitt Peak || Spacewatch || — || align=right data-sort-value="0.72" | 720 m || 
|-id=334 bgcolor=#E9E9E9
| 415334 ||  || — || October 4, 2006 || Mount Lemmon || Mount Lemmon Survey || — || align=right data-sort-value="0.82" | 820 m || 
|-id=335 bgcolor=#fefefe
| 415335 ||  || — || January 6, 2006 || Kitt Peak || Spacewatch || — || align=right data-sort-value="0.60" | 600 m || 
|-id=336 bgcolor=#fefefe
| 415336 ||  || — || October 21, 2007 || Mount Lemmon || Mount Lemmon Survey || — || align=right data-sort-value="0.71" | 710 m || 
|-id=337 bgcolor=#fefefe
| 415337 ||  || — || March 22, 2009 || Mount Lemmon || Mount Lemmon Survey || — || align=right data-sort-value="0.82" | 820 m || 
|-id=338 bgcolor=#fefefe
| 415338 ||  || — || October 7, 2007 || Catalina || CSS || — || align=right data-sort-value="0.76" | 760 m || 
|-id=339 bgcolor=#fefefe
| 415339 ||  || — || November 16, 2003 || Catalina || CSS || NYS || align=right data-sort-value="0.68" | 680 m || 
|-id=340 bgcolor=#E9E9E9
| 415340 ||  || — || May 14, 2005 || Mount Lemmon || Mount Lemmon Survey || — || align=right | 1.5 km || 
|-id=341 bgcolor=#fefefe
| 415341 ||  || — || April 14, 2010 || Catalina || CSS || H || align=right data-sort-value="0.90" | 900 m || 
|-id=342 bgcolor=#fefefe
| 415342 ||  || — || April 27, 2000 || Anderson Mesa || LONEOS || — || align=right data-sort-value="0.90" | 900 m || 
|-id=343 bgcolor=#fefefe
| 415343 ||  || — || January 20, 2006 || Kitt Peak || Spacewatch || — || align=right data-sort-value="0.87" | 870 m || 
|-id=344 bgcolor=#E9E9E9
| 415344 ||  || — || October 28, 2005 || Kitt Peak || Spacewatch || DOR || align=right | 2.6 km || 
|-id=345 bgcolor=#fefefe
| 415345 ||  || — || February 19, 2009 || Catalina || CSS || — || align=right data-sort-value="0.88" | 880 m || 
|-id=346 bgcolor=#fefefe
| 415346 ||  || — || September 28, 2003 || Kitt Peak || Spacewatch || — || align=right data-sort-value="0.87" | 870 m || 
|-id=347 bgcolor=#fefefe
| 415347 ||  || — || March 26, 2006 || Kitt Peak || Spacewatch || — || align=right data-sort-value="0.67" | 670 m || 
|-id=348 bgcolor=#E9E9E9
| 415348 ||  || — || November 1, 2010 || Kitt Peak || Spacewatch || — || align=right | 3.5 km || 
|-id=349 bgcolor=#E9E9E9
| 415349 ||  || — || November 3, 2005 || Catalina || CSS || — || align=right | 3.1 km || 
|-id=350 bgcolor=#E9E9E9
| 415350 ||  || — || June 13, 2009 || Kitt Peak || Spacewatch || — || align=right | 1.4 km || 
|-id=351 bgcolor=#fefefe
| 415351 ||  || — || February 20, 2002 || Kitt Peak || Spacewatch || NYS || align=right data-sort-value="0.56" | 560 m || 
|-id=352 bgcolor=#d6d6d6
| 415352 ||  || — || June 27, 2008 || Siding Spring || SSS || — || align=right | 2.9 km || 
|-id=353 bgcolor=#fefefe
| 415353 ||  || — || March 16, 2009 || Mount Lemmon || Mount Lemmon Survey || — || align=right data-sort-value="0.64" | 640 m || 
|-id=354 bgcolor=#E9E9E9
| 415354 ||  || — || November 17, 2006 || Mount Lemmon || Mount Lemmon Survey || — || align=right | 1.7 km || 
|-id=355 bgcolor=#fefefe
| 415355 ||  || — || September 28, 2003 || Kitt Peak || Spacewatch || — || align=right data-sort-value="0.85" | 850 m || 
|-id=356 bgcolor=#fefefe
| 415356 ||  || — || September 2, 2010 || Mount Lemmon || Mount Lemmon Survey || — || align=right data-sort-value="0.69" | 690 m || 
|-id=357 bgcolor=#E9E9E9
| 415357 ||  || — || September 3, 2010 || Mount Lemmon || Mount Lemmon Survey || — || align=right | 1.3 km || 
|-id=358 bgcolor=#fefefe
| 415358 ||  || — || December 24, 2011 || Mount Lemmon || Mount Lemmon Survey || — || align=right data-sort-value="0.93" | 930 m || 
|-id=359 bgcolor=#fefefe
| 415359 ||  || — || November 28, 2000 || Kitt Peak || Spacewatch || — || align=right data-sort-value="0.98" | 980 m || 
|-id=360 bgcolor=#E9E9E9
| 415360 ||  || — || September 7, 2004 || Socorro || LINEAR || — || align=right | 3.2 km || 
|-id=361 bgcolor=#d6d6d6
| 415361 ||  || — || October 1, 2003 || Anderson Mesa || LONEOS || — || align=right | 4.5 km || 
|-id=362 bgcolor=#E9E9E9
| 415362 ||  || — || July 15, 1993 || Kitt Peak || Spacewatch || — || align=right | 1.3 km || 
|-id=363 bgcolor=#fefefe
| 415363 ||  || — || October 8, 2004 || Kitt Peak || Spacewatch || — || align=right data-sort-value="0.86" | 860 m || 
|-id=364 bgcolor=#d6d6d6
| 415364 ||  || — || April 24, 2007 || Kitt Peak || Spacewatch || Tj (2.97) || align=right | 2.3 km || 
|-id=365 bgcolor=#fefefe
| 415365 ||  || — || November 2, 2007 || Kitt Peak || Spacewatch || — || align=right data-sort-value="0.97" | 970 m || 
|-id=366 bgcolor=#fefefe
| 415366 ||  || — || March 2, 2009 || Mount Lemmon || Mount Lemmon Survey || — || align=right | 1.1 km || 
|-id=367 bgcolor=#E9E9E9
| 415367 ||  || — || December 19, 2007 || Mount Lemmon || Mount Lemmon Survey || — || align=right | 1.0 km || 
|-id=368 bgcolor=#fefefe
| 415368 ||  || — || December 14, 2003 || Kitt Peak || Spacewatch || — || align=right | 1.2 km || 
|-id=369 bgcolor=#fefefe
| 415369 ||  || — || March 18, 2009 || Kitt Peak || Spacewatch || NYS || align=right data-sort-value="0.73" | 730 m || 
|-id=370 bgcolor=#E9E9E9
| 415370 ||  || — || March 7, 2008 || Mount Lemmon || Mount Lemmon Survey || — || align=right | 1.3 km || 
|-id=371 bgcolor=#E9E9E9
| 415371 ||  || — || November 7, 2010 || Mount Lemmon || Mount Lemmon Survey || — || align=right | 2.3 km || 
|-id=372 bgcolor=#fefefe
| 415372 ||  || — || April 5, 2003 || Kitt Peak || Spacewatch || — || align=right data-sort-value="0.56" | 560 m || 
|-id=373 bgcolor=#fefefe
| 415373 ||  || — || October 13, 2010 || Kitt Peak || Spacewatch || V || align=right data-sort-value="0.63" | 630 m || 
|-id=374 bgcolor=#d6d6d6
| 415374 ||  || — || March 12, 2007 || Mount Lemmon || Mount Lemmon Survey || — || align=right | 2.5 km || 
|-id=375 bgcolor=#E9E9E9
| 415375 ||  || — || July 28, 2009 || Catalina || CSS || — || align=right | 1.9 km || 
|-id=376 bgcolor=#E9E9E9
| 415376 ||  || — || May 13, 2004 || Kitt Peak || Spacewatch || EUN || align=right | 1.1 km || 
|-id=377 bgcolor=#E9E9E9
| 415377 ||  || — || September 11, 2010 || Mount Lemmon || Mount Lemmon Survey || — || align=right | 1.0 km || 
|-id=378 bgcolor=#fefefe
| 415378 ||  || — || November 26, 2003 || Kitt Peak || Spacewatch || — || align=right data-sort-value="0.94" | 940 m || 
|-id=379 bgcolor=#d6d6d6
| 415379 ||  || — || September 21, 2003 || Kitt Peak || Spacewatch || — || align=right | 2.5 km || 
|-id=380 bgcolor=#fefefe
| 415380 ||  || — || October 19, 2007 || Catalina || CSS || — || align=right | 1.0 km || 
|-id=381 bgcolor=#d6d6d6
| 415381 ||  || — || March 29, 2008 || Kitt Peak || Spacewatch || BRA || align=right | 1.3 km || 
|-id=382 bgcolor=#E9E9E9
| 415382 ||  || — || January 14, 1996 || Kitt Peak || Spacewatch || — || align=right data-sort-value="0.91" | 910 m || 
|-id=383 bgcolor=#fefefe
| 415383 ||  || — || May 5, 2003 || Anderson Mesa || LONEOS || — || align=right data-sort-value="0.77" | 770 m || 
|-id=384 bgcolor=#d6d6d6
| 415384 ||  || — || March 18, 2010 || WISE || WISE || — || align=right | 4.0 km || 
|-id=385 bgcolor=#d6d6d6
| 415385 ||  || — || September 15, 1999 || Kitt Peak || Spacewatch || — || align=right | 2.8 km || 
|-id=386 bgcolor=#d6d6d6
| 415386 ||  || — || May 11, 2007 || Mount Lemmon || Mount Lemmon Survey || — || align=right | 2.9 km || 
|-id=387 bgcolor=#d6d6d6
| 415387 ||  || — || January 30, 2011 || Kitt Peak || Spacewatch || — || align=right | 3.0 km || 
|-id=388 bgcolor=#d6d6d6
| 415388 ||  || — || May 13, 2007 || Kitt Peak || Spacewatch || — || align=right | 5.1 km || 
|-id=389 bgcolor=#d6d6d6
| 415389 ||  || — || June 9, 2007 || Catalina || CSS || Tj (2.96) || align=right | 4.7 km || 
|-id=390 bgcolor=#E9E9E9
| 415390 ||  || — || May 2, 2008 || Siding Spring || SSS || — || align=right | 2.5 km || 
|-id=391 bgcolor=#d6d6d6
| 415391 ||  || — || January 16, 2010 || WISE || WISE || — || align=right | 3.1 km || 
|-id=392 bgcolor=#E9E9E9
| 415392 ||  || — || October 22, 2005 || Kitt Peak || Spacewatch || — || align=right | 2.3 km || 
|-id=393 bgcolor=#E9E9E9
| 415393 ||  || — || January 27, 2007 || Kitt Peak || Spacewatch || — || align=right | 2.4 km || 
|-id=394 bgcolor=#d6d6d6
| 415394 ||  || — || March 25, 2007 || Mount Lemmon || Mount Lemmon Survey || EOS || align=right | 1.7 km || 
|-id=395 bgcolor=#fefefe
| 415395 ||  || — || October 17, 2006 || Kitt Peak || Spacewatch || V || align=right data-sort-value="0.71" | 710 m || 
|-id=396 bgcolor=#E9E9E9
| 415396 ||  || — || November 22, 2006 || Kitt Peak || Spacewatch || ADE || align=right | 2.2 km || 
|-id=397 bgcolor=#d6d6d6
| 415397 ||  || — || February 1, 2006 || Catalina || CSS || — || align=right | 5.3 km || 
|-id=398 bgcolor=#E9E9E9
| 415398 ||  || — || April 16, 2004 || Kitt Peak || Spacewatch || — || align=right | 1.0 km || 
|-id=399 bgcolor=#d6d6d6
| 415399 ||  || — || September 3, 2008 || Kitt Peak || Spacewatch || HYG || align=right | 2.3 km || 
|-id=400 bgcolor=#d6d6d6
| 415400 ||  || — || February 2, 2006 || Mount Lemmon || Mount Lemmon Survey || — || align=right | 3.3 km || 
|}

415401–415500 

|-bgcolor=#d6d6d6
| 415401 ||  || — || June 11, 2001 || Kitt Peak || Spacewatch || — || align=right | 6.4 km || 
|-id=402 bgcolor=#d6d6d6
| 415402 ||  || — || December 28, 2005 || Kitt Peak || Spacewatch || — || align=right | 3.2 km || 
|-id=403 bgcolor=#d6d6d6
| 415403 ||  || — || November 26, 2003 || Kitt Peak || Spacewatch || — || align=right | 3.9 km || 
|-id=404 bgcolor=#d6d6d6
| 415404 ||  || — || November 9, 2009 || Mount Lemmon || Mount Lemmon Survey || — || align=right | 3.6 km || 
|-id=405 bgcolor=#d6d6d6
| 415405 ||  || — || January 27, 2011 || Mount Lemmon || Mount Lemmon Survey || KOR || align=right | 1.4 km || 
|-id=406 bgcolor=#fefefe
| 415406 ||  || — || November 4, 1999 || Kitt Peak || Spacewatch || NYS || align=right data-sort-value="0.82" | 820 m || 
|-id=407 bgcolor=#d6d6d6
| 415407 ||  || — || November 26, 2003 || Kitt Peak || Spacewatch || — || align=right | 3.0 km || 
|-id=408 bgcolor=#d6d6d6
| 415408 ||  || — || October 3, 2003 || Kitt Peak || Spacewatch || EOS || align=right | 2.3 km || 
|-id=409 bgcolor=#d6d6d6
| 415409 ||  || — || October 4, 2003 || Kitt Peak || Spacewatch || — || align=right | 3.1 km || 
|-id=410 bgcolor=#E9E9E9
| 415410 ||  || — || August 18, 2009 || Kitt Peak || Spacewatch || — || align=right | 1.4 km || 
|-id=411 bgcolor=#d6d6d6
| 415411 ||  || — || October 21, 2003 || Kitt Peak || Spacewatch || — || align=right | 3.0 km || 
|-id=412 bgcolor=#d6d6d6
| 415412 ||  || — || October 1, 2008 || Mount Lemmon || Mount Lemmon Survey || — || align=right | 4.1 km || 
|-id=413 bgcolor=#d6d6d6
| 415413 ||  || — || October 26, 2009 || Mount Lemmon || Mount Lemmon Survey || — || align=right | 4.2 km || 
|-id=414 bgcolor=#d6d6d6
| 415414 ||  || — || September 30, 2003 || Kitt Peak || Spacewatch || — || align=right | 3.5 km || 
|-id=415 bgcolor=#E9E9E9
| 415415 ||  || — || April 25, 2003 || Kitt Peak || Spacewatch || — || align=right | 2.5 km || 
|-id=416 bgcolor=#fefefe
| 415416 ||  || — || December 22, 2000 || Kitt Peak || Spacewatch || V || align=right data-sort-value="0.80" | 800 m || 
|-id=417 bgcolor=#E9E9E9
| 415417 ||  || — || November 6, 2010 || Mount Lemmon || Mount Lemmon Survey || — || align=right | 1.2 km || 
|-id=418 bgcolor=#d6d6d6
| 415418 ||  || — || September 17, 2003 || Kitt Peak || Spacewatch || EOS || align=right | 1.6 km || 
|-id=419 bgcolor=#d6d6d6
| 415419 ||  || — || October 26, 2009 || Mount Lemmon || Mount Lemmon Survey || — || align=right | 2.8 km || 
|-id=420 bgcolor=#d6d6d6
| 415420 ||  || — || October 10, 2008 || Mount Lemmon || Mount Lemmon Survey || — || align=right | 3.1 km || 
|-id=421 bgcolor=#d6d6d6
| 415421 ||  || — || October 31, 1999 || Kitt Peak || Spacewatch || — || align=right | 2.3 km || 
|-id=422 bgcolor=#d6d6d6
| 415422 ||  || — || July 30, 2008 || Catalina || CSS || BRA || align=right | 1.6 km || 
|-id=423 bgcolor=#d6d6d6
| 415423 ||  || — || November 20, 2003 || Kitt Peak || Spacewatch || — || align=right | 4.7 km || 
|-id=424 bgcolor=#d6d6d6
| 415424 ||  || — || September 5, 2008 || Kitt Peak || Spacewatch || — || align=right | 2.7 km || 
|-id=425 bgcolor=#d6d6d6
| 415425 ||  || — || March 28, 2001 || Kitt Peak || Spacewatch || TEL || align=right | 1.4 km || 
|-id=426 bgcolor=#fefefe
| 415426 ||  || — || December 31, 2007 || Kitt Peak || Spacewatch || — || align=right data-sort-value="0.95" | 950 m || 
|-id=427 bgcolor=#d6d6d6
| 415427 ||  || — || January 7, 2006 || Mount Lemmon || Mount Lemmon Survey || KOR || align=right | 1.4 km || 
|-id=428 bgcolor=#d6d6d6
| 415428 ||  || — || January 7, 2006 || Mount Lemmon || Mount Lemmon Survey || — || align=right | 3.4 km || 
|-id=429 bgcolor=#fefefe
| 415429 ||  || — || April 10, 2005 || Catalina || CSS || PHO || align=right | 3.8 km || 
|-id=430 bgcolor=#d6d6d6
| 415430 ||  || — || September 30, 2003 || Socorro || LINEAR || EOS || align=right | 2.5 km || 
|-id=431 bgcolor=#E9E9E9
| 415431 ||  || — || October 27, 2005 || Mount Lemmon || Mount Lemmon Survey || — || align=right | 2.2 km || 
|-id=432 bgcolor=#fefefe
| 415432 ||  || — || September 28, 2006 || Catalina || CSS || — || align=right | 1.2 km || 
|-id=433 bgcolor=#E9E9E9
| 415433 ||  || — || October 5, 2004 || Kitt Peak || Spacewatch || AGN || align=right | 1.5 km || 
|-id=434 bgcolor=#d6d6d6
| 415434 ||  || — || February 25, 2011 || Mount Lemmon || Mount Lemmon Survey || — || align=right | 3.1 km || 
|-id=435 bgcolor=#d6d6d6
| 415435 ||  || — || October 2, 2008 || Kitt Peak || Spacewatch || — || align=right | 2.9 km || 
|-id=436 bgcolor=#d6d6d6
| 415436 ||  || — || February 14, 2005 || Kitt Peak || Spacewatch || EOS || align=right | 2.4 km || 
|-id=437 bgcolor=#d6d6d6
| 415437 ||  || — || March 5, 2006 || Kitt Peak || Spacewatch || EOS || align=right | 2.2 km || 
|-id=438 bgcolor=#d6d6d6
| 415438 ||  || — || September 21, 2008 || Kitt Peak || Spacewatch || HYG || align=right | 3.5 km || 
|-id=439 bgcolor=#d6d6d6
| 415439 ||  || — || February 16, 2004 || Kitt Peak || Spacewatch || — || align=right | 3.6 km || 
|-id=440 bgcolor=#d6d6d6
| 415440 ||  || — || June 2, 2003 || Kitt Peak || Spacewatch || 3:2 || align=right | 4.4 km || 
|-id=441 bgcolor=#E9E9E9
| 415441 ||  || — || November 6, 2005 || Mount Lemmon || Mount Lemmon Survey || — || align=right | 3.0 km || 
|-id=442 bgcolor=#d6d6d6
| 415442 ||  || — || September 6, 2008 || Mount Lemmon || Mount Lemmon Survey || — || align=right | 2.6 km || 
|-id=443 bgcolor=#d6d6d6
| 415443 ||  || — || August 23, 2008 || Kitt Peak || Spacewatch || KOR || align=right | 1.6 km || 
|-id=444 bgcolor=#C2FFFF
| 415444 ||  || — || February 1, 2006 || Kitt Peak || Spacewatch || L5 || align=right | 11 km || 
|-id=445 bgcolor=#d6d6d6
| 415445 ||  || — || February 9, 2010 || Catalina || CSS || — || align=right | 4.2 km || 
|-id=446 bgcolor=#d6d6d6
| 415446 ||  || — || October 10, 2008 || Kitt Peak || Spacewatch || — || align=right | 2.9 km || 
|-id=447 bgcolor=#d6d6d6
| 415447 ||  || — || September 29, 2008 || Mount Lemmon || Mount Lemmon Survey || — || align=right | 4.4 km || 
|-id=448 bgcolor=#E9E9E9
| 415448 ||  || — || September 9, 2004 || Kitt Peak || Spacewatch || — || align=right | 2.7 km || 
|-id=449 bgcolor=#C2FFFF
| 415449 ||  || — || March 10, 2007 || Kitt Peak || Spacewatch || L5 || align=right | 9.3 km || 
|-id=450 bgcolor=#d6d6d6
| 415450 ||  || — || March 11, 2005 || Mount Lemmon || Mount Lemmon Survey || — || align=right | 3.5 km || 
|-id=451 bgcolor=#E9E9E9
| 415451 ||  || — || May 9, 2002 || Kitt Peak || Spacewatch || — || align=right | 2.9 km || 
|-id=452 bgcolor=#d6d6d6
| 415452 ||  || — || November 19, 2003 || Kitt Peak || Spacewatch || EMA || align=right | 4.8 km || 
|-id=453 bgcolor=#d6d6d6
| 415453 ||  || — || October 21, 2007 || Mount Lemmon || Mount Lemmon Survey || — || align=right | 4.6 km || 
|-id=454 bgcolor=#C2FFFF
| 415454 ||  || — || September 19, 2001 || Kitt Peak || Spacewatch || L5 || align=right | 9.0 km || 
|-id=455 bgcolor=#d6d6d6
| 415455 ||  || — || January 22, 2004 || Socorro || LINEAR || EOS || align=right | 2.4 km || 
|-id=456 bgcolor=#d6d6d6
| 415456 ||  || — || April 2, 2006 || Kitt Peak || Spacewatch || 3:2 || align=right | 3.7 km || 
|-id=457 bgcolor=#d6d6d6
| 415457 ||  || — || February 27, 2006 || Kitt Peak || Spacewatch || SHU3:2 || align=right | 7.4 km || 
|-id=458 bgcolor=#E9E9E9
| 415458 ||  || — || March 1, 1995 || Kitt Peak || Spacewatch || AGN || align=right | 1.2 km || 
|-id=459 bgcolor=#E9E9E9
| 415459 ||  || — || December 22, 2003 || Kitt Peak || Spacewatch || — || align=right | 1.7 km || 
|-id=460 bgcolor=#fefefe
| 415460 ||  || — || December 27, 2003 || Socorro || LINEAR || — || align=right data-sort-value="0.83" | 830 m || 
|-id=461 bgcolor=#d6d6d6
| 415461 ||  || — || August 10, 2004 || Socorro || LINEAR || — || align=right | 2.3 km || 
|-id=462 bgcolor=#d6d6d6
| 415462 ||  || — || March 1, 2009 || Kitt Peak || Spacewatch || BRA || align=right | 1.9 km || 
|-id=463 bgcolor=#fefefe
| 415463 ||  || — || April 26, 2003 || Kitt Peak || Spacewatch || — || align=right data-sort-value="0.69" | 690 m || 
|-id=464 bgcolor=#fefefe
| 415464 ||  || — || October 3, 2003 || Kitt Peak || Spacewatch || — || align=right data-sort-value="0.73" | 730 m || 
|-id=465 bgcolor=#fefefe
| 415465 ||  || — || April 11, 2010 || Kitt Peak || Spacewatch || BAP || align=right data-sort-value="0.89" | 890 m || 
|-id=466 bgcolor=#fefefe
| 415466 ||  || — || December 24, 2005 || Kitt Peak || Spacewatch || — || align=right data-sort-value="0.89" | 890 m || 
|-id=467 bgcolor=#fefefe
| 415467 ||  || — || September 13, 2007 || Kitt Peak || Spacewatch || — || align=right data-sort-value="0.75" | 750 m || 
|-id=468 bgcolor=#d6d6d6
| 415468 ||  || — || June 17, 2009 || Kitt Peak || Spacewatch || BRA || align=right | 1.6 km || 
|-id=469 bgcolor=#E9E9E9
| 415469 ||  || — || May 17, 2005 || Mount Lemmon || Mount Lemmon Survey || — || align=right | 1.2 km || 
|-id=470 bgcolor=#E9E9E9
| 415470 ||  || — || September 1, 2005 || Kitt Peak || Spacewatch || — || align=right | 2.3 km || 
|-id=471 bgcolor=#d6d6d6
| 415471 ||  || — || May 6, 2006 || Mount Lemmon || Mount Lemmon Survey || (260)7:4 || align=right | 3.2 km || 
|-id=472 bgcolor=#fefefe
| 415472 ||  || — || September 28, 2011 || Kitt Peak || Spacewatch || — || align=right data-sort-value="0.78" | 780 m || 
|-id=473 bgcolor=#FA8072
| 415473 ||  || — || October 1, 2003 || Anderson Mesa || LONEOS || — || align=right | 1.2 km || 
|-id=474 bgcolor=#fefefe
| 415474 ||  || — || September 4, 2007 || Catalina || CSS || — || align=right data-sort-value="0.98" | 980 m || 
|-id=475 bgcolor=#E9E9E9
| 415475 ||  || — || December 11, 2006 || Kitt Peak || Spacewatch || — || align=right | 1.5 km || 
|-id=476 bgcolor=#fefefe
| 415476 ||  || — || March 3, 2009 || Mount Lemmon || Mount Lemmon Survey || — || align=right data-sort-value="0.85" | 850 m || 
|-id=477 bgcolor=#d6d6d6
| 415477 ||  || — || October 19, 2003 || Kitt Peak || Spacewatch || THM || align=right | 2.5 km || 
|-id=478 bgcolor=#fefefe
| 415478 ||  || — || August 19, 2010 || XuYi || PMO NEO || — || align=right data-sort-value="0.84" | 840 m || 
|-id=479 bgcolor=#E9E9E9
| 415479 ||  || — || September 19, 2006 || Kitt Peak || Spacewatch || — || align=right data-sort-value="0.83" | 830 m || 
|-id=480 bgcolor=#E9E9E9
| 415480 ||  || — || June 4, 2005 || Kitt Peak || Spacewatch || — || align=right | 1.6 km || 
|-id=481 bgcolor=#fefefe
| 415481 ||  || — || October 3, 1999 || Kitt Peak || Spacewatch || — || align=right data-sort-value="0.97" | 970 m || 
|-id=482 bgcolor=#d6d6d6
| 415482 ||  || — || October 25, 2009 || Catalina || CSS || — || align=right | 2.7 km || 
|-id=483 bgcolor=#d6d6d6
| 415483 ||  || — || December 22, 2005 || Kitt Peak || Spacewatch || — || align=right | 3.6 km || 
|-id=484 bgcolor=#fefefe
| 415484 ||  || — || April 18, 2007 || Mount Lemmon || Mount Lemmon Survey || — || align=right data-sort-value="0.65" | 650 m || 
|-id=485 bgcolor=#fefefe
| 415485 ||  || — || February 4, 1995 || Kitt Peak || Spacewatch || V || align=right data-sort-value="0.80" | 800 m || 
|-id=486 bgcolor=#E9E9E9
| 415486 ||  || — || October 28, 2006 || Catalina || CSS || ADE || align=right | 2.0 km || 
|-id=487 bgcolor=#fefefe
| 415487 ||  || — || March 23, 2006 || Catalina || CSS || V || align=right data-sort-value="0.95" | 950 m || 
|-id=488 bgcolor=#fefefe
| 415488 ||  || — || April 9, 2010 || Mount Lemmon || Mount Lemmon Survey || — || align=right data-sort-value="0.76" | 760 m || 
|-id=489 bgcolor=#E9E9E9
| 415489 ||  || — || September 21, 2001 || Socorro || LINEAR || — || align=right | 1.6 km || 
|-id=490 bgcolor=#fefefe
| 415490 ||  || — || September 13, 2007 || Mount Lemmon || Mount Lemmon Survey || — || align=right data-sort-value="0.51" | 510 m || 
|-id=491 bgcolor=#fefefe
| 415491 ||  || — || March 25, 2006 || Mount Lemmon || Mount Lemmon Survey || NYS || align=right data-sort-value="0.53" | 530 m || 
|-id=492 bgcolor=#d6d6d6
| 415492 ||  || — || March 9, 2007 || Mount Lemmon || Mount Lemmon Survey || KOR || align=right | 1.3 km || 
|-id=493 bgcolor=#fefefe
| 415493 ||  || — || December 29, 2011 || Kitt Peak || Spacewatch || — || align=right data-sort-value="0.79" | 790 m || 
|-id=494 bgcolor=#d6d6d6
| 415494 ||  || — || September 28, 2003 || Kitt Peak || Spacewatch || THM || align=right | 2.2 km || 
|-id=495 bgcolor=#E9E9E9
| 415495 ||  || — || April 30, 2008 || Kitt Peak || Spacewatch || — || align=right | 2.8 km || 
|-id=496 bgcolor=#E9E9E9
| 415496 ||  || — || June 29, 2005 || Kitt Peak || Spacewatch || — || align=right | 1.5 km || 
|-id=497 bgcolor=#d6d6d6
| 415497 ||  || — || September 17, 2009 || Catalina || CSS || — || align=right | 3.9 km || 
|-id=498 bgcolor=#fefefe
| 415498 ||  || — || April 2, 2006 || Kitt Peak || Spacewatch || MAS || align=right data-sort-value="0.62" | 620 m || 
|-id=499 bgcolor=#E9E9E9
| 415499 ||  || — || March 1, 2008 || Kitt Peak || Spacewatch || AGN || align=right | 1.2 km || 
|-id=500 bgcolor=#fefefe
| 415500 ||  || — || January 29, 2009 || Kitt Peak || Spacewatch || MAS || align=right data-sort-value="0.94" | 940 m || 
|}

415501–415600 

|-bgcolor=#d6d6d6
| 415501 ||  || — || January 10, 2007 || Mount Lemmon || Mount Lemmon Survey || — || align=right | 2.2 km || 
|-id=502 bgcolor=#E9E9E9
| 415502 ||  || — || February 10, 1996 || Kitt Peak || Spacewatch || ADE || align=right | 2.0 km || 
|-id=503 bgcolor=#fefefe
| 415503 ||  || — || October 7, 2004 || Kitt Peak || Spacewatch || — || align=right data-sort-value="0.45" | 450 m || 
|-id=504 bgcolor=#E9E9E9
| 415504 ||  || — || March 28, 2008 || Kitt Peak || Spacewatch || AGN || align=right | 1.2 km || 
|-id=505 bgcolor=#E9E9E9
| 415505 ||  || — || August 21, 2006 || Kitt Peak || Spacewatch || — || align=right data-sort-value="0.78" | 780 m || 
|-id=506 bgcolor=#d6d6d6
| 415506 ||  || — || December 21, 2005 || Kitt Peak || Spacewatch || KOR || align=right | 1.4 km || 
|-id=507 bgcolor=#E9E9E9
| 415507 ||  || — || August 28, 2005 || Kitt Peak || Spacewatch || — || align=right | 2.4 km || 
|-id=508 bgcolor=#E9E9E9
| 415508 ||  || — || February 23, 2007 || Kitt Peak || Spacewatch || GEF || align=right | 1.1 km || 
|-id=509 bgcolor=#d6d6d6
| 415509 ||  || — || October 1, 2005 || Kitt Peak || Spacewatch || KOR || align=right | 1.5 km || 
|-id=510 bgcolor=#d6d6d6
| 415510 ||  || — || February 7, 2006 || Kitt Peak || Spacewatch || VER || align=right | 3.2 km || 
|-id=511 bgcolor=#E9E9E9
| 415511 ||  || — || September 26, 2006 || Catalina || CSS || — || align=right | 1.0 km || 
|-id=512 bgcolor=#E9E9E9
| 415512 ||  || — || June 20, 2010 || WISE || WISE || — || align=right | 1.7 km || 
|-id=513 bgcolor=#fefefe
| 415513 ||  || — || May 12, 2007 || Mount Lemmon || Mount Lemmon Survey || (883) || align=right data-sort-value="0.60" | 600 m || 
|-id=514 bgcolor=#E9E9E9
| 415514 ||  || — || July 22, 2006 || Mount Lemmon || Mount Lemmon Survey || — || align=right data-sort-value="0.98" | 980 m || 
|-id=515 bgcolor=#fefefe
| 415515 ||  || — || March 8, 2005 || Mount Lemmon || Mount Lemmon Survey || — || align=right data-sort-value="0.98" | 980 m || 
|-id=516 bgcolor=#fefefe
| 415516 ||  || — || June 21, 2007 || Mount Lemmon || Mount Lemmon Survey || — || align=right data-sort-value="0.77" | 770 m || 
|-id=517 bgcolor=#fefefe
| 415517 ||  || — || October 22, 2003 || Kitt Peak || Spacewatch || — || align=right data-sort-value="0.67" | 670 m || 
|-id=518 bgcolor=#d6d6d6
| 415518 ||  || — || September 28, 1992 || Kitt Peak || Spacewatch || LIX || align=right | 3.7 km || 
|-id=519 bgcolor=#E9E9E9
| 415519 ||  || — || September 25, 2006 || Kitt Peak || Spacewatch || — || align=right | 3.0 km || 
|-id=520 bgcolor=#E9E9E9
| 415520 ||  || — || September 8, 2010 || Kitt Peak || Spacewatch || — || align=right | 1.4 km || 
|-id=521 bgcolor=#d6d6d6
| 415521 ||  || — || February 17, 2007 || Mount Lemmon || Mount Lemmon Survey || — || align=right | 2.4 km || 
|-id=522 bgcolor=#d6d6d6
| 415522 ||  || — || September 20, 2003 || Campo Imperatore || CINEOS || — || align=right | 2.2 km || 
|-id=523 bgcolor=#fefefe
| 415523 ||  || — || August 17, 2007 || Siding Spring || SSS || — || align=right | 1.2 km || 
|-id=524 bgcolor=#fefefe
| 415524 ||  || — || April 4, 2010 || WISE || WISE || — || align=right | 2.8 km || 
|-id=525 bgcolor=#fefefe
| 415525 ||  || — || October 6, 2011 || Mount Lemmon || Mount Lemmon Survey || — || align=right data-sort-value="0.71" | 710 m || 
|-id=526 bgcolor=#fefefe
| 415526 ||  || — || January 26, 2006 || Kitt Peak || Spacewatch || — || align=right data-sort-value="0.86" | 860 m || 
|-id=527 bgcolor=#E9E9E9
| 415527 ||  || — || February 29, 2004 || Kitt Peak || Spacewatch || — || align=right | 1.8 km || 
|-id=528 bgcolor=#fefefe
| 415528 ||  || — || July 26, 1995 || Kitt Peak || Spacewatch || — || align=right data-sort-value="0.75" | 750 m || 
|-id=529 bgcolor=#fefefe
| 415529 ||  || — || September 9, 2007 || Kitt Peak || Spacewatch || — || align=right data-sort-value="0.75" | 750 m || 
|-id=530 bgcolor=#d6d6d6
| 415530 ||  || — || May 30, 2008 || Kitt Peak || Spacewatch || — || align=right | 2.5 km || 
|-id=531 bgcolor=#fefefe
| 415531 ||  || — || September 20, 1995 || Kitt Peak || Spacewatch || — || align=right data-sort-value="0.95" | 950 m || 
|-id=532 bgcolor=#d6d6d6
| 415532 ||  || — || October 3, 2003 || Kitt Peak || Spacewatch || — || align=right | 3.3 km || 
|-id=533 bgcolor=#E9E9E9
| 415533 ||  || — || December 13, 2006 || Kitt Peak || Spacewatch || PAD || align=right | 2.0 km || 
|-id=534 bgcolor=#E9E9E9
| 415534 ||  || — || September 16, 2001 || Socorro || LINEAR || — || align=right | 2.2 km || 
|-id=535 bgcolor=#fefefe
| 415535 ||  || — || January 13, 2005 || Kitt Peak || Spacewatch || — || align=right data-sort-value="0.71" | 710 m || 
|-id=536 bgcolor=#d6d6d6
| 415536 ||  || — || March 10, 2007 || Mount Lemmon || Mount Lemmon Survey || — || align=right | 2.6 km || 
|-id=537 bgcolor=#d6d6d6
| 415537 ||  || — || September 16, 2003 || Kitt Peak || Spacewatch || critical || align=right | 2.0 km || 
|-id=538 bgcolor=#fefefe
| 415538 ||  || — || October 10, 2007 || Mount Lemmon || Mount Lemmon Survey || — || align=right data-sort-value="0.85" | 850 m || 
|-id=539 bgcolor=#d6d6d6
| 415539 ||  || — || October 22, 2005 || Kitt Peak || Spacewatch || KOR || align=right | 1.3 km || 
|-id=540 bgcolor=#fefefe
| 415540 ||  || — || March 12, 2003 || Kitt Peak || Spacewatch || — || align=right data-sort-value="0.78" | 780 m || 
|-id=541 bgcolor=#d6d6d6
| 415541 ||  || — || August 26, 2009 || Catalina || CSS || KOR || align=right | 1.5 km || 
|-id=542 bgcolor=#fefefe
| 415542 ||  || — || April 10, 2010 || Kitt Peak || Spacewatch || — || align=right data-sort-value="0.54" | 540 m || 
|-id=543 bgcolor=#fefefe
| 415543 ||  || — || December 29, 2008 || Mount Lemmon || Mount Lemmon Survey || — || align=right data-sort-value="0.59" | 590 m || 
|-id=544 bgcolor=#E9E9E9
| 415544 ||  || — || February 29, 2008 || Kitt Peak || Spacewatch || — || align=right | 2.4 km || 
|-id=545 bgcolor=#fefefe
| 415545 ||  || — || May 20, 2010 || Mount Lemmon || Mount Lemmon Survey || — || align=right data-sort-value="0.89" | 890 m || 
|-id=546 bgcolor=#d6d6d6
| 415546 ||  || — || February 1, 2006 || Mount Lemmon || Mount Lemmon Survey || — || align=right | 2.4 km || 
|-id=547 bgcolor=#d6d6d6
| 415547 ||  || — || February 24, 2006 || Kitt Peak || Spacewatch || — || align=right | 2.4 km || 
|-id=548 bgcolor=#E9E9E9
| 415548 ||  || — || December 22, 1998 || Kitt Peak || Spacewatch || — || align=right data-sort-value="0.75" | 750 m || 
|-id=549 bgcolor=#E9E9E9
| 415549 ||  || — || February 18, 2004 || Kitt Peak || Spacewatch || MAR || align=right | 1.1 km || 
|-id=550 bgcolor=#fefefe
| 415550 ||  || — || November 10, 2004 || Kitt Peak || Spacewatch || — || align=right data-sort-value="0.91" | 910 m || 
|-id=551 bgcolor=#d6d6d6
| 415551 ||  || — || September 18, 2003 || Kitt Peak || Spacewatch || — || align=right | 2.9 km || 
|-id=552 bgcolor=#fefefe
| 415552 ||  || — || October 24, 2011 || Kitt Peak || Spacewatch || V || align=right data-sort-value="0.62" | 620 m || 
|-id=553 bgcolor=#E9E9E9
| 415553 ||  || — || September 16, 2010 || Kitt Peak || Spacewatch || — || align=right | 1.4 km || 
|-id=554 bgcolor=#d6d6d6
| 415554 ||  || — || January 30, 2006 || Kitt Peak || Spacewatch || — || align=right | 3.2 km || 
|-id=555 bgcolor=#d6d6d6
| 415555 ||  || — || March 4, 2005 || Mount Lemmon || Mount Lemmon Survey || 7:4 || align=right | 4.2 km || 
|-id=556 bgcolor=#E9E9E9
| 415556 ||  || — || August 19, 2006 || Kitt Peak || Spacewatch || — || align=right | 1.0 km || 
|-id=557 bgcolor=#E9E9E9
| 415557 ||  || — || September 17, 2006 || Catalina || CSS || — || align=right data-sort-value="0.82" | 820 m || 
|-id=558 bgcolor=#d6d6d6
| 415558 ||  || — || January 8, 2006 || Mount Lemmon || Mount Lemmon Survey || — || align=right | 2.4 km || 
|-id=559 bgcolor=#E9E9E9
| 415559 ||  || — || August 21, 2006 || Kitt Peak || Spacewatch || — || align=right data-sort-value="0.81" | 810 m || 
|-id=560 bgcolor=#d6d6d6
| 415560 ||  || — || December 27, 2006 || Mount Lemmon || Mount Lemmon Survey || — || align=right | 2.1 km || 
|-id=561 bgcolor=#fefefe
| 415561 ||  || — || September 19, 2003 || Kitt Peak || Spacewatch || — || align=right data-sort-value="0.77" | 770 m || 
|-id=562 bgcolor=#d6d6d6
| 415562 ||  || — || December 21, 2003 || Kitt Peak || Spacewatch || — || align=right | 2.3 km || 
|-id=563 bgcolor=#E9E9E9
| 415563 ||  || — || March 31, 2008 || Mount Lemmon || Mount Lemmon Survey || — || align=right | 2.0 km || 
|-id=564 bgcolor=#E9E9E9
| 415564 ||  || — || February 28, 2008 || Mount Lemmon || Mount Lemmon Survey || — || align=right | 1.0 km || 
|-id=565 bgcolor=#E9E9E9
| 415565 ||  || — || September 27, 2005 || Kitt Peak || Spacewatch || — || align=right | 2.3 km || 
|-id=566 bgcolor=#E9E9E9
| 415566 ||  || — || October 1, 2005 || Kitt Peak || Spacewatch || — || align=right | 1.9 km || 
|-id=567 bgcolor=#fefefe
| 415567 ||  || — || October 21, 2003 || Socorro || LINEAR || — || align=right data-sort-value="0.71" | 710 m || 
|-id=568 bgcolor=#d6d6d6
| 415568 ||  || — || April 18, 2002 || Kitt Peak || Spacewatch || EOS || align=right | 2.5 km || 
|-id=569 bgcolor=#d6d6d6
| 415569 ||  || — || October 22, 2009 || Mount Lemmon || Mount Lemmon Survey || critical || align=right | 2.8 km || 
|-id=570 bgcolor=#d6d6d6
| 415570 ||  || — || September 23, 2009 || Kitt Peak || Spacewatch || — || align=right | 3.4 km || 
|-id=571 bgcolor=#d6d6d6
| 415571 ||  || — || February 2, 2005 || Socorro || LINEAR || — || align=right | 3.0 km || 
|-id=572 bgcolor=#fefefe
| 415572 ||  || — || December 10, 2004 || Socorro || LINEAR || — || align=right data-sort-value="0.93" | 930 m || 
|-id=573 bgcolor=#fefefe
| 415573 ||  || — || September 23, 2000 || Socorro || LINEAR || — || align=right data-sort-value="0.78" | 780 m || 
|-id=574 bgcolor=#fefefe
| 415574 ||  || — || March 27, 2000 || Kitt Peak || Spacewatch || — || align=right data-sort-value="0.67" | 670 m || 
|-id=575 bgcolor=#fefefe
| 415575 ||  || — || February 1, 2006 || Kitt Peak || Spacewatch || — || align=right data-sort-value="0.69" | 690 m || 
|-id=576 bgcolor=#d6d6d6
| 415576 ||  || — || May 7, 2008 || Kitt Peak || Spacewatch || — || align=right | 2.6 km || 
|-id=577 bgcolor=#d6d6d6
| 415577 ||  || — || October 1, 2005 || Catalina || CSS || — || align=right | 3.6 km || 
|-id=578 bgcolor=#E9E9E9
| 415578 ||  || — || May 3, 2005 || Catalina || CSS || ADE || align=right | 3.1 km || 
|-id=579 bgcolor=#E9E9E9
| 415579 ||  || — || April 2, 2005 || Kitt Peak || Spacewatch || — || align=right | 1.1 km || 
|-id=580 bgcolor=#d6d6d6
| 415580 ||  || — || March 20, 2007 || Mount Lemmon || Mount Lemmon Survey || — || align=right | 2.2 km || 
|-id=581 bgcolor=#fefefe
| 415581 ||  || — || August 23, 2007 || Kitt Peak || Spacewatch || — || align=right | 1.6 km || 
|-id=582 bgcolor=#E9E9E9
| 415582 ||  || — || December 18, 2001 || Socorro || LINEAR || — || align=right | 1.8 km || 
|-id=583 bgcolor=#E9E9E9
| 415583 ||  || — || October 31, 2005 || Mount Lemmon || Mount Lemmon Survey || — || align=right | 2.0 km || 
|-id=584 bgcolor=#fefefe
| 415584 ||  || — || September 11, 2007 || Catalina || CSS || — || align=right | 1.0 km || 
|-id=585 bgcolor=#d6d6d6
| 415585 ||  || — || July 30, 2008 || Catalina || CSS || LIX || align=right | 5.0 km || 
|-id=586 bgcolor=#d6d6d6
| 415586 ||  || — || November 28, 2003 || Kitt Peak || Spacewatch || — || align=right | 4.2 km || 
|-id=587 bgcolor=#d6d6d6
| 415587 ||  || — || February 26, 2007 || Mount Lemmon || Mount Lemmon Survey || — || align=right | 3.2 km || 
|-id=588 bgcolor=#d6d6d6
| 415588 ||  || — || September 19, 2003 || Kitt Peak || Spacewatch || — || align=right | 3.0 km || 
|-id=589 bgcolor=#fefefe
| 415589 ||  || — || December 15, 2004 || Kitt Peak || Spacewatch || — || align=right data-sort-value="0.67" | 670 m || 
|-id=590 bgcolor=#E9E9E9
| 415590 ||  || — || May 3, 2010 || WISE || WISE || — || align=right | 1.4 km || 
|-id=591 bgcolor=#d6d6d6
| 415591 ||  || — || September 17, 2010 || Kitt Peak || Spacewatch || — || align=right | 4.1 km || 
|-id=592 bgcolor=#E9E9E9
| 415592 ||  || — || December 17, 2007 || Mount Lemmon || Mount Lemmon Survey || — || align=right | 2.2 km || 
|-id=593 bgcolor=#d6d6d6
| 415593 ||  || — || September 29, 2005 || Mount Lemmon || Mount Lemmon Survey || KOR || align=right | 1.3 km || 
|-id=594 bgcolor=#d6d6d6
| 415594 ||  || — || October 27, 2005 || Kitt Peak || Spacewatch || KOR || align=right | 1.2 km || 
|-id=595 bgcolor=#d6d6d6
| 415595 ||  || — || March 12, 2007 || Kitt Peak || Spacewatch || EOS || align=right | 2.0 km || 
|-id=596 bgcolor=#d6d6d6
| 415596 ||  || — || October 3, 2008 || Kitt Peak || Spacewatch || — || align=right | 3.5 km || 
|-id=597 bgcolor=#d6d6d6
| 415597 ||  || — || March 27, 1995 || Kitt Peak || Spacewatch || — || align=right | 3.7 km || 
|-id=598 bgcolor=#d6d6d6
| 415598 ||  || — || September 19, 2003 || Anderson Mesa || LONEOS || — || align=right | 3.2 km || 
|-id=599 bgcolor=#fefefe
| 415599 ||  || — || September 21, 2003 || Kitt Peak || Spacewatch || — || align=right | 1.2 km || 
|-id=600 bgcolor=#fefefe
| 415600 ||  || — || February 10, 2002 || Socorro || LINEAR || — || align=right data-sort-value="0.89" | 890 m || 
|}

415601–415700 

|-bgcolor=#E9E9E9
| 415601 ||  || — || August 28, 2005 || Kitt Peak || Spacewatch || — || align=right | 2.4 km || 
|-id=602 bgcolor=#E9E9E9
| 415602 ||  || — || May 15, 2005 || Mount Lemmon || Mount Lemmon Survey || EUN || align=right | 2.6 km || 
|-id=603 bgcolor=#d6d6d6
| 415603 ||  || — || March 12, 1996 || Kitt Peak || Spacewatch || — || align=right | 3.5 km || 
|-id=604 bgcolor=#fefefe
| 415604 ||  || — || January 17, 2005 || Kitt Peak || Spacewatch || — || align=right data-sort-value="0.72" | 720 m || 
|-id=605 bgcolor=#fefefe
| 415605 ||  || — || February 1, 1995 || Kitt Peak || Spacewatch || — || align=right data-sort-value="0.69" | 690 m || 
|-id=606 bgcolor=#fefefe
| 415606 ||  || — || February 27, 2006 || Kitt Peak || Spacewatch || — || align=right data-sort-value="0.67" | 670 m || 
|-id=607 bgcolor=#E9E9E9
| 415607 ||  || — || October 30, 2005 || Kitt Peak || Spacewatch || AGN || align=right | 1.2 km || 
|-id=608 bgcolor=#d6d6d6
| 415608 ||  || — || February 20, 2010 || WISE || WISE || — || align=right | 3.7 km || 
|-id=609 bgcolor=#fefefe
| 415609 ||  || — || July 5, 2010 || Mount Lemmon || Mount Lemmon Survey || NYS || align=right data-sort-value="0.70" | 700 m || 
|-id=610 bgcolor=#E9E9E9
| 415610 ||  || — || October 26, 2005 || Kitt Peak || Spacewatch || — || align=right | 2.0 km || 
|-id=611 bgcolor=#d6d6d6
| 415611 ||  || — || November 10, 2004 || Kitt Peak || Spacewatch || — || align=right | 2.5 km || 
|-id=612 bgcolor=#d6d6d6
| 415612 ||  || — || October 6, 1999 || Kitt Peak || Spacewatch || — || align=right | 3.1 km || 
|-id=613 bgcolor=#fefefe
| 415613 ||  || — || October 21, 2003 || Kitt Peak || Spacewatch || — || align=right data-sort-value="0.71" | 710 m || 
|-id=614 bgcolor=#E9E9E9
| 415614 ||  || — || October 7, 2005 || Kitt Peak || Spacewatch || — || align=right | 2.1 km || 
|-id=615 bgcolor=#fefefe
| 415615 ||  || — || March 31, 2009 || Kitt Peak || Spacewatch || — || align=right data-sort-value="0.94" | 940 m || 
|-id=616 bgcolor=#d6d6d6
| 415616 ||  || — || October 4, 1999 || Kitt Peak || Spacewatch || — || align=right | 2.0 km || 
|-id=617 bgcolor=#E9E9E9
| 415617 ||  || — || October 27, 2005 || Kitt Peak || Spacewatch || — || align=right | 2.3 km || 
|-id=618 bgcolor=#d6d6d6
| 415618 ||  || — || June 5, 2002 || Kitt Peak || Spacewatch || — || align=right | 3.9 km || 
|-id=619 bgcolor=#fefefe
| 415619 ||  || — || November 30, 2003 || Kitt Peak || Spacewatch || — || align=right data-sort-value="0.67" | 670 m || 
|-id=620 bgcolor=#fefefe
| 415620 ||  || — || August 23, 2007 || Kitt Peak || Spacewatch || V || align=right data-sort-value="0.46" | 460 m || 
|-id=621 bgcolor=#fefefe
| 415621 ||  || — || September 30, 2003 || Kitt Peak || Spacewatch || NYS || align=right data-sort-value="0.63" | 630 m || 
|-id=622 bgcolor=#d6d6d6
| 415622 ||  || — || September 30, 2009 || Mount Lemmon || Mount Lemmon Survey || — || align=right | 2.9 km || 
|-id=623 bgcolor=#d6d6d6
| 415623 ||  || — || February 16, 2010 || WISE || WISE || — || align=right | 4.6 km || 
|-id=624 bgcolor=#d6d6d6
| 415624 ||  || — || July 28, 2008 || Mount Lemmon || Mount Lemmon Survey || — || align=right | 3.8 km || 
|-id=625 bgcolor=#fefefe
| 415625 ||  || — || October 10, 2007 || Kitt Peak || Spacewatch || MAS || align=right data-sort-value="0.76" | 760 m || 
|-id=626 bgcolor=#fefefe
| 415626 ||  || — || September 18, 2003 || Kitt Peak || Spacewatch || — || align=right data-sort-value="0.71" | 710 m || 
|-id=627 bgcolor=#d6d6d6
| 415627 ||  || — || March 3, 2000 || Kitt Peak || Spacewatch || — || align=right | 5.3 km || 
|-id=628 bgcolor=#fefefe
| 415628 ||  || — || April 10, 2002 || Socorro || LINEAR || NYS || align=right data-sort-value="0.82" | 820 m || 
|-id=629 bgcolor=#fefefe
| 415629 ||  || — || October 4, 1994 || Kitt Peak || Spacewatch || — || align=right data-sort-value="0.69" | 690 m || 
|-id=630 bgcolor=#E9E9E9
| 415630 ||  || — || September 11, 2005 || Kitt Peak || Spacewatch || GEF || align=right | 1.1 km || 
|-id=631 bgcolor=#d6d6d6
| 415631 ||  || — || October 9, 2004 || Kitt Peak || Spacewatch || EOS || align=right | 1.8 km || 
|-id=632 bgcolor=#d6d6d6
| 415632 ||  || — || October 23, 2009 || Kitt Peak || Spacewatch || — || align=right | 2.7 km || 
|-id=633 bgcolor=#d6d6d6
| 415633 ||  || — || October 29, 2003 || Kitt Peak || Spacewatch || — || align=right | 3.1 km || 
|-id=634 bgcolor=#d6d6d6
| 415634 ||  || — || September 11, 1994 || Kitt Peak || Spacewatch || — || align=right | 2.1 km || 
|-id=635 bgcolor=#d6d6d6
| 415635 ||  || — || January 6, 2006 || Mount Lemmon || Mount Lemmon Survey || — || align=right | 4.3 km || 
|-id=636 bgcolor=#E9E9E9
| 415636 ||  || — || October 31, 2006 || Mount Lemmon || Mount Lemmon Survey || (5) || align=right data-sort-value="0.81" | 810 m || 
|-id=637 bgcolor=#E9E9E9
| 415637 ||  || — || October 4, 1997 || Kitt Peak || Spacewatch || — || align=right | 1.8 km || 
|-id=638 bgcolor=#d6d6d6
| 415638 ||  || — || September 15, 2009 || Kitt Peak || Spacewatch || — || align=right | 2.4 km || 
|-id=639 bgcolor=#d6d6d6
| 415639 ||  || — || October 16, 2003 || Kitt Peak || Spacewatch || — || align=right | 3.7 km || 
|-id=640 bgcolor=#E9E9E9
| 415640 ||  || — || January 10, 2007 || Mount Lemmon || Mount Lemmon Survey || AGN || align=right | 1.2 km || 
|-id=641 bgcolor=#d6d6d6
| 415641 ||  || — || October 26, 2009 || Mount Lemmon || Mount Lemmon Survey || — || align=right | 2.8 km || 
|-id=642 bgcolor=#d6d6d6
| 415642 ||  || — || October 19, 2003 || Kitt Peak || Spacewatch || — || align=right | 2.3 km || 
|-id=643 bgcolor=#fefefe
| 415643 ||  || — || September 10, 2007 || Mount Lemmon || Mount Lemmon Survey || — || align=right data-sort-value="0.54" | 540 m || 
|-id=644 bgcolor=#d6d6d6
| 415644 ||  || — || September 22, 2009 || Kitt Peak || Spacewatch || EOS || align=right | 2.2 km || 
|-id=645 bgcolor=#d6d6d6
| 415645 ||  || — || October 13, 2004 || Kitt Peak || Spacewatch || — || align=right | 3.6 km || 
|-id=646 bgcolor=#d6d6d6
| 415646 ||  || — || December 9, 2010 || Mount Lemmon || Mount Lemmon Survey || — || align=right | 2.8 km || 
|-id=647 bgcolor=#d6d6d6
| 415647 ||  || — || October 17, 2003 || Kitt Peak || Spacewatch || — || align=right | 3.0 km || 
|-id=648 bgcolor=#E9E9E9
| 415648 ||  || — || September 26, 2005 || Kitt Peak || Spacewatch || — || align=right | 2.0 km || 
|-id=649 bgcolor=#fefefe
| 415649 ||  || — || February 10, 2002 || Socorro || LINEAR || V || align=right data-sort-value="0.65" | 650 m || 
|-id=650 bgcolor=#E9E9E9
| 415650 ||  || — || March 21, 2004 || Kitt Peak || Spacewatch || — || align=right data-sort-value="0.92" | 920 m || 
|-id=651 bgcolor=#d6d6d6
| 415651 ||  || — || September 16, 2003 || Kitt Peak || Spacewatch || — || align=right | 4.4 km || 
|-id=652 bgcolor=#E9E9E9
| 415652 ||  || — || November 5, 2010 || Kitt Peak || Spacewatch || — || align=right | 2.1 km || 
|-id=653 bgcolor=#E9E9E9
| 415653 ||  || — || September 19, 2006 || Kitt Peak || Spacewatch || — || align=right data-sort-value="0.75" | 750 m || 
|-id=654 bgcolor=#E9E9E9
| 415654 ||  || — || March 18, 2004 || Kitt Peak || Spacewatch || — || align=right | 1.8 km || 
|-id=655 bgcolor=#fefefe
| 415655 ||  || — || May 1, 2003 || Kitt Peak || Spacewatch || — || align=right | 1.0 km || 
|-id=656 bgcolor=#fefefe
| 415656 ||  || — || August 4, 2003 || Kitt Peak || Spacewatch || — || align=right data-sort-value="0.75" | 750 m || 
|-id=657 bgcolor=#fefefe
| 415657 ||  || — || August 23, 2007 || Kitt Peak || Spacewatch || — || align=right | 1.1 km || 
|-id=658 bgcolor=#fefefe
| 415658 ||  || — || August 9, 2007 || Kitt Peak || Spacewatch || — || align=right data-sort-value="0.96" | 960 m || 
|-id=659 bgcolor=#fefefe
| 415659 ||  || — || November 11, 2004 || Kitt Peak || Spacewatch || — || align=right data-sort-value="0.69" | 690 m || 
|-id=660 bgcolor=#E9E9E9
| 415660 ||  || — || August 30, 2005 || Anderson Mesa || LONEOS || — || align=right | 2.7 km || 
|-id=661 bgcolor=#d6d6d6
| 415661 ||  || — || September 19, 2003 || Kitt Peak || Spacewatch || HYG || align=right | 2.8 km || 
|-id=662 bgcolor=#fefefe
| 415662 ||  || — || February 12, 2000 || Kitt Peak || Spacewatch || — || align=right data-sort-value="0.69" | 690 m || 
|-id=663 bgcolor=#d6d6d6
| 415663 ||  || — || February 21, 2007 || Kitt Peak || Spacewatch || KOR || align=right | 1.3 km || 
|-id=664 bgcolor=#d6d6d6
| 415664 ||  || — || September 15, 2004 || Kitt Peak || Spacewatch || — || align=right | 2.9 km || 
|-id=665 bgcolor=#fefefe
| 415665 ||  || — || May 31, 2006 || Kitt Peak || Spacewatch || — || align=right data-sort-value="0.98" | 980 m || 
|-id=666 bgcolor=#d6d6d6
| 415666 ||  || — || October 23, 2009 || Mount Lemmon || Mount Lemmon Survey || — || align=right | 2.1 km || 
|-id=667 bgcolor=#E9E9E9
| 415667 ||  || — || March 19, 2004 || Socorro || LINEAR || MAR || align=right data-sort-value="0.97" | 970 m || 
|-id=668 bgcolor=#d6d6d6
| 415668 ||  || — || September 26, 2009 || Kitt Peak || Spacewatch || EOS || align=right | 1.6 km || 
|-id=669 bgcolor=#fefefe
| 415669 ||  || — || February 25, 2006 || Mount Lemmon || Mount Lemmon Survey || — || align=right | 2.4 km || 
|-id=670 bgcolor=#d6d6d6
| 415670 ||  || — || January 31, 2006 || Mount Lemmon || Mount Lemmon Survey || — || align=right | 2.2 km || 
|-id=671 bgcolor=#d6d6d6
| 415671 ||  || — || August 17, 2009 || Kitt Peak || Spacewatch || — || align=right | 3.1 km || 
|-id=672 bgcolor=#d6d6d6
| 415672 ||  || — || September 18, 2009 || Catalina || CSS || — || align=right | 3.6 km || 
|-id=673 bgcolor=#d6d6d6
| 415673 ||  || — || August 20, 2004 || Catalina || CSS || — || align=right | 2.8 km || 
|-id=674 bgcolor=#fefefe
| 415674 ||  || — || October 15, 2007 || Mount Lemmon || Mount Lemmon Survey || — || align=right data-sort-value="0.92" | 920 m || 
|-id=675 bgcolor=#d6d6d6
| 415675 ||  || — || March 26, 2006 || Kitt Peak || Spacewatch || — || align=right | 4.3 km || 
|-id=676 bgcolor=#d6d6d6
| 415676 ||  || — || September 5, 1999 || Kitt Peak || Spacewatch || — || align=right | 2.1 km || 
|-id=677 bgcolor=#d6d6d6
| 415677 ||  || — || September 18, 2003 || Kitt Peak || Spacewatch || — || align=right | 3.6 km || 
|-id=678 bgcolor=#E9E9E9
| 415678 ||  || — || August 28, 2005 || Kitt Peak || Spacewatch || MRX || align=right data-sort-value="0.87" | 870 m || 
|-id=679 bgcolor=#E9E9E9
| 415679 ||  || — || October 28, 1994 || Kitt Peak || Spacewatch || — || align=right | 1.3 km || 
|-id=680 bgcolor=#d6d6d6
| 415680 ||  || — || December 24, 2006 || Kitt Peak || Spacewatch || — || align=right | 3.4 km || 
|-id=681 bgcolor=#fefefe
| 415681 ||  || — || September 15, 2007 || Mt. Lemmon || Mount Lemmon Survey || — || align=right | 1.1 km || 
|-id=682 bgcolor=#fefefe
| 415682 ||  || — || October 10, 2004 || Socorro || LINEAR || — || align=right data-sort-value="0.76" | 760 m || 
|-id=683 bgcolor=#E9E9E9
| 415683 ||  || — || October 17, 2010 || Mt. Lemmon || Mount Lemmon Survey || WIT || align=right data-sort-value="0.82" | 820 m || 
|-id=684 bgcolor=#d6d6d6
| 415684 ||  || — || October 23, 2009 || Mt. Lemmon || Mount Lemmon Survey || HYG || align=right | 2.8 km || 
|-id=685 bgcolor=#d6d6d6
| 415685 ||  || — || July 14, 2004 || Siding Spring || SSS || — || align=right | 3.2 km || 
|-id=686 bgcolor=#d6d6d6
| 415686 ||  || — || March 26, 2007 || Mt. Lemmon || Mount Lemmon Survey || — || align=right | 3.7 km || 
|-id=687 bgcolor=#fefefe
| 415687 ||  || — || November 20, 2003 || Kitt Peak || Spacewatch || — || align=right | 1.2 km || 
|-id=688 bgcolor=#E9E9E9
| 415688 || 5113 T-2 || — || September 25, 1973 || Palomar || PLS || — || align=right | 2.3 km || 
|-id=689 bgcolor=#FA8072
| 415689 ||  || — || May 6, 1991 || Kitt Peak || Spacewatch || H || align=right data-sort-value="0.65" | 650 m || 
|-id=690 bgcolor=#FA8072
| 415690 || 1992 UB || — || October 21, 1992 || Siding Spring || R. H. McNaught || unusual || align=right | 2.8 km || 
|-id=691 bgcolor=#E9E9E9
| 415691 ||  || — || September 17, 1993 || La Silla || E. W. Elst || — || align=right | 1.0 km || 
|-id=692 bgcolor=#E9E9E9
| 415692 ||  || — || September 17, 1995 || Kitt Peak || Spacewatch || — || align=right | 1.9 km || 
|-id=693 bgcolor=#E9E9E9
| 415693 ||  || — || September 18, 1995 || Kitt Peak || Spacewatch || — || align=right | 1.9 km || 
|-id=694 bgcolor=#fefefe
| 415694 ||  || — || September 25, 1995 || Kitt Peak || Spacewatch || MAS || align=right data-sort-value="0.56" | 560 m || 
|-id=695 bgcolor=#E9E9E9
| 415695 ||  || — || April 15, 1996 || Haleakala || AMOS || — || align=right | 2.2 km || 
|-id=696 bgcolor=#fefefe
| 415696 ||  || — || April 11, 1996 || Kitt Peak || Spacewatch || — || align=right data-sort-value="0.76" | 760 m || 
|-id=697 bgcolor=#d6d6d6
| 415697 ||  || — || October 4, 1996 || Kitt Peak || Spacewatch || — || align=right | 3.1 km || 
|-id=698 bgcolor=#fefefe
| 415698 ||  || — || October 8, 1996 || Kitt Peak || Spacewatch || — || align=right data-sort-value="0.92" | 920 m || 
|-id=699 bgcolor=#fefefe
| 415699 ||  || — || December 6, 1996 || Kitt Peak || Spacewatch || — || align=right data-sort-value="0.88" | 880 m || 
|-id=700 bgcolor=#E9E9E9
| 415700 ||  || — || December 4, 1996 || Kitt Peak || Spacewatch || — || align=right | 2.9 km || 
|}

415701–415800 

|-bgcolor=#E9E9E9
| 415701 ||  || — || March 3, 1997 || Kitt Peak || Spacewatch || — || align=right | 2.3 km || 
|-id=702 bgcolor=#d6d6d6
| 415702 ||  || — || September 28, 1997 || Kitt Peak || Spacewatch || — || align=right | 3.0 km || 
|-id=703 bgcolor=#E9E9E9
| 415703 ||  || — || October 31, 1997 || Bergisch Gladbac || W. Bickel || (5) || align=right data-sort-value="0.98" | 980 m || 
|-id=704 bgcolor=#E9E9E9
| 415704 ||  || — || January 22, 1998 || Kitt Peak || Spacewatch || — || align=right | 1.2 km || 
|-id=705 bgcolor=#E9E9E9
| 415705 ||  || — || April 22, 1998 || Kitt Peak || Spacewatch || EUN || align=right | 1.4 km || 
|-id=706 bgcolor=#d6d6d6
| 415706 ||  || — || September 15, 1998 || Kitt Peak || Spacewatch || — || align=right | 2.8 km || 
|-id=707 bgcolor=#d6d6d6
| 415707 ||  || — || September 25, 1998 || Kitt Peak || Spacewatch || — || align=right | 2.4 km || 
|-id=708 bgcolor=#d6d6d6
| 415708 ||  || — || September 17, 1998 || Anderson Mesa || LONEOS || — || align=right | 2.3 km || 
|-id=709 bgcolor=#d6d6d6
| 415709 ||  || — || October 18, 1998 || Kitt Peak || Spacewatch || — || align=right | 3.3 km || 
|-id=710 bgcolor=#FFC2E0
| 415710 ||  || — || November 18, 1998 || Catalina || CSS || AMOcritical || align=right data-sort-value="0.71" | 710 m || 
|-id=711 bgcolor=#FFC2E0
| 415711 ||  || — || November 23, 1998 || Socorro || LINEAR || AMO || align=right data-sort-value="0.35" | 350 m || 
|-id=712 bgcolor=#d6d6d6
| 415712 ||  || — || November 21, 1998 || Kitt Peak || Spacewatch || — || align=right | 3.3 km || 
|-id=713 bgcolor=#FFC2E0
| 415713 ||  || — || December 8, 1998 || Socorro || LINEAR || ATEPHA || align=right data-sort-value="0.37" | 370 m || 
|-id=714 bgcolor=#E9E9E9
| 415714 ||  || — || December 25, 1998 || Kitt Peak || Spacewatch || — || align=right | 1.1 km || 
|-id=715 bgcolor=#FFC2E0
| 415715 ||  || — || January 9, 1999 || Socorro || LINEAR || AMO +1km || align=right data-sort-value="0.84" | 840 m || 
|-id=716 bgcolor=#d6d6d6
| 415716 ||  || — || February 7, 1999 || Kitt Peak || Spacewatch || — || align=right | 2.9 km || 
|-id=717 bgcolor=#d6d6d6
| 415717 ||  || — || February 7, 1999 || Kitt Peak || Spacewatch || TIR || align=right | 3.6 km || 
|-id=718 bgcolor=#fefefe
| 415718 ||  || — || March 21, 1999 || Apache Point || SDSS || — || align=right data-sort-value="0.67" | 670 m || 
|-id=719 bgcolor=#E9E9E9
| 415719 ||  || — || April 19, 1999 || Kitt Peak || Spacewatch || — || align=right | 1.4 km || 
|-id=720 bgcolor=#C2E0FF
| 415720 ||  || — || September 7, 1999 || Mauna Kea || C. Trujillo, J. X. Luu, D. C. Jewitt || cubewano (hot)critical || align=right | 155 km || 
|-id=721 bgcolor=#fefefe
| 415721 || 1999 SC || — || September 16, 1999 || Prescott || P. G. Comba || — || align=right data-sort-value="0.84" | 840 m || 
|-id=722 bgcolor=#d6d6d6
| 415722 ||  || — || October 8, 1999 || Kitt Peak || Spacewatch || — || align=right | 2.2 km || 
|-id=723 bgcolor=#fefefe
| 415723 ||  || — || October 6, 1999 || Socorro || LINEAR || — || align=right data-sort-value="0.92" | 920 m || 
|-id=724 bgcolor=#fefefe
| 415724 ||  || — || October 10, 1999 || Socorro || LINEAR || — || align=right | 1.2 km || 
|-id=725 bgcolor=#fefefe
| 415725 ||  || — || October 1, 1999 || Kitt Peak || Spacewatch || — || align=right data-sort-value="0.71" | 710 m || 
|-id=726 bgcolor=#fefefe
| 415726 ||  || — || October 1, 1999 || Kitt Peak || Spacewatch || — || align=right data-sort-value="0.76" | 760 m || 
|-id=727 bgcolor=#fefefe
| 415727 ||  || — || October 13, 1999 || Apache Point || SDSS || MAS || align=right data-sort-value="0.61" | 610 m || 
|-id=728 bgcolor=#fefefe
| 415728 ||  || — || October 31, 1999 || Kitt Peak || Spacewatch || — || align=right data-sort-value="0.50" | 500 m || 
|-id=729 bgcolor=#FA8072
| 415729 ||  || — || November 3, 1999 || Socorro || LINEAR || — || align=right | 2.2 km || 
|-id=730 bgcolor=#fefefe
| 415730 ||  || — || September 17, 1999 || Kitt Peak || Spacewatch || — || align=right | 1.1 km || 
|-id=731 bgcolor=#fefefe
| 415731 ||  || — || October 10, 1999 || Socorro || LINEAR || — || align=right | 1.2 km || 
|-id=732 bgcolor=#d6d6d6
| 415732 ||  || — || November 9, 1999 || Socorro || LINEAR || — || align=right | 3.4 km || 
|-id=733 bgcolor=#d6d6d6
| 415733 ||  || — || November 2, 1999 || Kitt Peak || Spacewatch || — || align=right | 3.2 km || 
|-id=734 bgcolor=#d6d6d6
| 415734 ||  || — || November 11, 1999 || Kitt Peak || Spacewatch || — || align=right | 2.6 km || 
|-id=735 bgcolor=#E9E9E9
| 415735 ||  || — || November 29, 1999 || Kitt Peak || Spacewatch || AEO || align=right | 1.1 km || 
|-id=736 bgcolor=#fefefe
| 415736 ||  || — || November 29, 1999 || Kitt Peak || Spacewatch || V || align=right data-sort-value="0.72" | 720 m || 
|-id=737 bgcolor=#fefefe
| 415737 ||  || — || December 15, 1999 || Kitt Peak || Spacewatch || — || align=right data-sort-value="0.69" | 690 m || 
|-id=738 bgcolor=#fefefe
| 415738 ||  || — || December 29, 1999 || Mauna Kea || C. Veillet || — || align=right data-sort-value="0.66" | 660 m || 
|-id=739 bgcolor=#fefefe
| 415739 ||  || — || February 3, 2000 || Socorro || LINEAR || — || align=right | 1.2 km || 
|-id=740 bgcolor=#fefefe
| 415740 ||  || — || February 26, 2000 || Kitt Peak || Spacewatch || NYS || align=right data-sort-value="0.77" | 770 m || 
|-id=741 bgcolor=#d6d6d6
| 415741 ||  || — || February 27, 2000 || Kitt Peak || Spacewatch || — || align=right | 3.4 km || 
|-id=742 bgcolor=#fefefe
| 415742 ||  || — || February 28, 2000 || Kitt Peak || Spacewatch || — || align=right data-sort-value="0.88" | 880 m || 
|-id=743 bgcolor=#d6d6d6
| 415743 ||  || — || March 5, 2000 || Socorro || LINEAR || — || align=right | 3.2 km || 
|-id=744 bgcolor=#d6d6d6
| 415744 ||  || — || March 3, 2000 || Socorro || LINEAR || — || align=right | 2.4 km || 
|-id=745 bgcolor=#FFC2E0
| 415745 ||  || — || April 14, 2000 || Socorro || LINEAR || APOPHA || align=right data-sort-value="0.53" | 530 m || 
|-id=746 bgcolor=#FFC2E0
| 415746 ||  || — || May 7, 2000 || Socorro || LINEAR || AMO +1km || align=right | 1.00 km || 
|-id=747 bgcolor=#fefefe
| 415747 ||  || — || May 4, 2000 || Apache Point || SDSS || H || align=right data-sort-value="0.78" | 780 m || 
|-id=748 bgcolor=#d6d6d6
| 415748 ||  || — || May 24, 2000 || Kitt Peak || Spacewatch || EOS || align=right | 2.6 km || 
|-id=749 bgcolor=#E9E9E9
| 415749 ||  || — || May 28, 2000 || Socorro || LINEAR || — || align=right | 2.0 km || 
|-id=750 bgcolor=#d6d6d6
| 415750 ||  || — || June 5, 2000 || Kitt Peak || Spacewatch || — || align=right | 4.4 km || 
|-id=751 bgcolor=#fefefe
| 415751 ||  || — || June 23, 2000 || Kitt Peak || Spacewatch || — || align=right data-sort-value="0.74" | 740 m || 
|-id=752 bgcolor=#FA8072
| 415752 ||  || — || July 31, 2000 || Socorro || LINEAR || unusual || align=right | 2.3 km || 
|-id=753 bgcolor=#E9E9E9
| 415753 ||  || — || August 25, 2000 || Socorro || LINEAR || EUN || align=right | 1.6 km || 
|-id=754 bgcolor=#FA8072
| 415754 ||  || — || August 25, 2000 || Socorro || LINEAR || — || align=right | 1.1 km || 
|-id=755 bgcolor=#E9E9E9
| 415755 ||  || — || August 31, 2000 || Socorro || LINEAR || — || align=right | 2.0 km || 
|-id=756 bgcolor=#E9E9E9
| 415756 ||  || — || August 31, 2000 || Socorro || LINEAR || JUN || align=right | 1.2 km || 
|-id=757 bgcolor=#E9E9E9
| 415757 ||  || — || September 1, 2000 || Socorro || LINEAR || — || align=right | 2.2 km || 
|-id=758 bgcolor=#E9E9E9
| 415758 ||  || — || September 1, 2000 || Socorro || LINEAR || CLO || align=right | 2.4 km || 
|-id=759 bgcolor=#E9E9E9
| 415759 ||  || — || September 5, 2000 || Anderson Mesa || LONEOS || — || align=right | 3.3 km || 
|-id=760 bgcolor=#FA8072
| 415760 ||  || — || September 5, 2000 || Anderson Mesa || LONEOS || — || align=right | 1.1 km || 
|-id=761 bgcolor=#FA8072
| 415761 ||  || — || September 25, 2000 || Višnjan Observatory || K. Korlević || — || align=right data-sort-value="0.82" | 820 m || 
|-id=762 bgcolor=#fefefe
| 415762 ||  || — || September 24, 2000 || Socorro || LINEAR || — || align=right data-sort-value="0.89" | 890 m || 
|-id=763 bgcolor=#fefefe
| 415763 ||  || — || September 24, 2000 || Socorro || LINEAR || — || align=right | 1.1 km || 
|-id=764 bgcolor=#E9E9E9
| 415764 ||  || — || September 23, 2000 || Anderson Mesa || LONEOS || DOR || align=right | 3.0 km || 
|-id=765 bgcolor=#E9E9E9
| 415765 ||  || — || September 22, 2000 || Socorro || LINEAR || — || align=right | 3.0 km || 
|-id=766 bgcolor=#fefefe
| 415766 ||  || — || September 28, 2000 || Socorro || LINEAR || — || align=right data-sort-value="0.97" | 970 m || 
|-id=767 bgcolor=#fefefe
| 415767 ||  || — || September 20, 2000 || Kitt Peak || Spacewatch || — || align=right data-sort-value="0.54" | 540 m || 
|-id=768 bgcolor=#fefefe
| 415768 ||  || — || September 28, 2000 || Socorro || LINEAR || — || align=right data-sort-value="0.88" | 880 m || 
|-id=769 bgcolor=#E9E9E9
| 415769 ||  || — || September 27, 2000 || Socorro || LINEAR || CLO || align=right | 2.8 km || 
|-id=770 bgcolor=#fefefe
| 415770 ||  || — || September 24, 2000 || Socorro || LINEAR || — || align=right data-sort-value="0.69" | 690 m || 
|-id=771 bgcolor=#fefefe
| 415771 ||  || — || October 2, 2000 || Socorro || LINEAR || — || align=right data-sort-value="0.79" | 790 m || 
|-id=772 bgcolor=#fefefe
| 415772 ||  || — || October 3, 2000 || Socorro || LINEAR || — || align=right data-sort-value="0.78" | 780 m || 
|-id=773 bgcolor=#E9E9E9
| 415773 ||  || — || October 31, 2000 || Socorro || LINEAR || — || align=right | 2.3 km || 
|-id=774 bgcolor=#E9E9E9
| 415774 ||  || — || October 25, 2000 || Socorro || LINEAR || — || align=right | 2.5 km || 
|-id=775 bgcolor=#E9E9E9
| 415775 ||  || — || October 25, 2000 || Socorro || LINEAR || — || align=right | 2.9 km || 
|-id=776 bgcolor=#FA8072
| 415776 ||  || — || November 1, 2000 || Socorro || LINEAR || — || align=right data-sort-value="0.90" | 900 m || 
|-id=777 bgcolor=#fefefe
| 415777 ||  || — || November 1, 2000 || Socorro || LINEAR || — || align=right data-sort-value="0.85" | 850 m || 
|-id=778 bgcolor=#E9E9E9
| 415778 ||  || — || November 1, 2000 || Socorro || LINEAR || — || align=right | 2.7 km || 
|-id=779 bgcolor=#E9E9E9
| 415779 ||  || — || November 19, 2000 || Socorro || LINEAR || — || align=right | 4.1 km || 
|-id=780 bgcolor=#FA8072
| 415780 ||  || — || November 20, 2000 || Socorro || LINEAR || — || align=right | 1.1 km || 
|-id=781 bgcolor=#E9E9E9
| 415781 ||  || — || November 22, 2000 || Kitt Peak || Spacewatch || — || align=right | 2.9 km || 
|-id=782 bgcolor=#fefefe
| 415782 ||  || — || November 20, 2000 || Socorro || LINEAR || — || align=right data-sort-value="0.98" | 980 m || 
|-id=783 bgcolor=#fefefe
| 415783 ||  || — || November 25, 2000 || Kitt Peak || Spacewatch || — || align=right data-sort-value="0.64" | 640 m || 
|-id=784 bgcolor=#E9E9E9
| 415784 ||  || — || November 27, 2000 || Kitt Peak || Spacewatch || — || align=right | 2.0 km || 
|-id=785 bgcolor=#fefefe
| 415785 ||  || — || November 20, 2000 || Socorro || LINEAR || (2076) || align=right | 1.0 km || 
|-id=786 bgcolor=#E9E9E9
| 415786 ||  || — || November 21, 2000 || Socorro || LINEAR || — || align=right | 2.5 km || 
|-id=787 bgcolor=#fefefe
| 415787 ||  || — || November 21, 2000 || Socorro || LINEAR || — || align=right data-sort-value="0.89" | 890 m || 
|-id=788 bgcolor=#fefefe
| 415788 ||  || — || November 27, 2000 || Socorro || LINEAR || — || align=right data-sort-value="0.60" | 600 m || 
|-id=789 bgcolor=#E9E9E9
| 415789 ||  || — || November 24, 2000 || Kitt Peak || DLS || — || align=right | 2.3 km || 
|-id=790 bgcolor=#E9E9E9
| 415790 ||  || — || December 1, 2000 || Socorro || LINEAR || — || align=right | 2.6 km || 
|-id=791 bgcolor=#E9E9E9
| 415791 ||  || — || January 3, 2001 || Socorro || LINEAR || — || align=right | 1.8 km || 
|-id=792 bgcolor=#fefefe
| 415792 ||  || — || December 22, 2000 || Kitt Peak || Spacewatch || — || align=right data-sort-value="0.65" | 650 m || 
|-id=793 bgcolor=#fefefe
| 415793 ||  || — || January 18, 2001 || Socorro || LINEAR || — || align=right | 1.3 km || 
|-id=794 bgcolor=#FA8072
| 415794 ||  || — || January 20, 2001 || Socorro || LINEAR || — || align=right | 2.6 km || 
|-id=795 bgcolor=#fefefe
| 415795 ||  || — || February 1, 2001 || Anderson Mesa || LONEOS || — || align=right | 1.1 km || 
|-id=796 bgcolor=#fefefe
| 415796 ||  || — || February 16, 2001 || Socorro || LINEAR || — || align=right data-sort-value="0.90" | 900 m || 
|-id=797 bgcolor=#fefefe
| 415797 ||  || — || March 14, 2001 || Anderson Mesa || LONEOS || — || align=right | 1.1 km || 
|-id=798 bgcolor=#fefefe
| 415798 ||  || — || February 22, 2001 || Socorro || LINEAR || — || align=right | 1.4 km || 
|-id=799 bgcolor=#E9E9E9
| 415799 ||  || — || March 20, 2001 || Anderson Mesa || LONEOS || — || align=right | 3.1 km || 
|-id=800 bgcolor=#fefefe
| 415800 ||  || — || March 21, 2001 || Kitt Peak || SKADS || MAS || align=right data-sort-value="0.60" | 600 m || 
|}

415801–415900 

|-bgcolor=#d6d6d6
| 415801 ||  || — || March 21, 2001 || Kitt Peak || SKADS || — || align=right | 2.3 km || 
|-id=802 bgcolor=#FA8072
| 415802 ||  || — || May 15, 2001 || Anderson Mesa || LONEOS || — || align=right data-sort-value="0.90" | 900 m || 
|-id=803 bgcolor=#E9E9E9
| 415803 ||  || — || June 15, 2001 || Kitt Peak || Spacewatch || — || align=right data-sort-value="0.90" | 900 m || 
|-id=804 bgcolor=#E9E9E9
| 415804 ||  || — || July 18, 2001 || Palomar || NEAT || — || align=right | 1.6 km || 
|-id=805 bgcolor=#fefefe
| 415805 ||  || — || July 18, 2001 || Palomar || NEAT || H || align=right data-sort-value="0.94" | 940 m || 
|-id=806 bgcolor=#E9E9E9
| 415806 ||  || — || July 28, 2001 || Haleakala || NEAT || — || align=right | 1.4 km || 
|-id=807 bgcolor=#E9E9E9
| 415807 ||  || — || August 11, 2001 || Haleakala || NEAT || — || align=right | 1.8 km || 
|-id=808 bgcolor=#E9E9E9
| 415808 ||  || — || August 10, 2001 || Palomar || NEAT || — || align=right | 1.8 km || 
|-id=809 bgcolor=#E9E9E9
| 415809 ||  || — || August 10, 2001 || Palomar || NEAT || — || align=right | 1.3 km || 
|-id=810 bgcolor=#E9E9E9
| 415810 ||  || — || August 11, 2001 || Palomar || NEAT || — || align=right | 1.3 km || 
|-id=811 bgcolor=#FA8072
| 415811 ||  || — || August 13, 2001 || Palomar || NEAT || — || align=right | 1.2 km || 
|-id=812 bgcolor=#E9E9E9
| 415812 ||  || — || August 14, 2001 || Palomar || NEAT || — || align=right | 1.9 km || 
|-id=813 bgcolor=#E9E9E9
| 415813 ||  || — || August 14, 2001 || Palomar || NEAT || — || align=right | 2.3 km || 
|-id=814 bgcolor=#E9E9E9
| 415814 ||  || — || August 5, 2005 || Siding Spring || SSS || critical || align=right | 1.2 km || 
|-id=815 bgcolor=#E9E9E9
| 415815 ||  || — || August 16, 2001 || Socorro || LINEAR || — || align=right | 1.00 km || 
|-id=816 bgcolor=#E9E9E9
| 415816 ||  || — || August 21, 2001 || Emerald Lane || L. Ball || — || align=right | 1.0 km || 
|-id=817 bgcolor=#E9E9E9
| 415817 ||  || — || August 16, 2001 || Palomar || NEAT || — || align=right | 1.5 km || 
|-id=818 bgcolor=#FA8072
| 415818 ||  || — || August 26, 2001 || Socorro || LINEAR || — || align=right | 2.2 km || 
|-id=819 bgcolor=#E9E9E9
| 415819 ||  || — || August 26, 2001 || Socorro || LINEAR || — || align=right | 2.8 km || 
|-id=820 bgcolor=#E9E9E9
| 415820 ||  || — || August 30, 2001 || Ondřejov || L. Kotková || — || align=right | 1.2 km || 
|-id=821 bgcolor=#E9E9E9
| 415821 ||  || — || August 24, 2001 || Haleakala || NEAT || KON || align=right | 2.8 km || 
|-id=822 bgcolor=#E9E9E9
| 415822 ||  || — || August 23, 2001 || Socorro || LINEAR || — || align=right | 2.5 km || 
|-id=823 bgcolor=#E9E9E9
| 415823 ||  || — || August 25, 2001 || Socorro || LINEAR || EUN || align=right | 1.5 km || 
|-id=824 bgcolor=#E9E9E9
| 415824 ||  || — || August 21, 2001 || Haleakala || NEAT || — || align=right | 1.3 km || 
|-id=825 bgcolor=#E9E9E9
| 415825 ||  || — || August 24, 2001 || Socorro || LINEAR || RAF || align=right | 1.1 km || 
|-id=826 bgcolor=#E9E9E9
| 415826 ||  || — || August 24, 2001 || Socorro || LINEAR || — || align=right | 1.4 km || 
|-id=827 bgcolor=#E9E9E9
| 415827 ||  || — || August 25, 2001 || Anderson Mesa || LONEOS || — || align=right | 1.7 km || 
|-id=828 bgcolor=#E9E9E9
| 415828 ||  || — || August 20, 2001 || Socorro || LINEAR || EUN || align=right | 1.5 km || 
|-id=829 bgcolor=#E9E9E9
| 415829 ||  || — || August 13, 2001 || Haleakala || NEAT || — || align=right | 1.7 km || 
|-id=830 bgcolor=#E9E9E9
| 415830 ||  || — || September 8, 2001 || Socorro || LINEAR || — || align=right | 1.6 km || 
|-id=831 bgcolor=#E9E9E9
| 415831 ||  || — || September 7, 2001 || Socorro || LINEAR || — || align=right data-sort-value="0.93" | 930 m || 
|-id=832 bgcolor=#E9E9E9
| 415832 ||  || — || September 10, 2001 || Socorro || LINEAR || — || align=right | 1.5 km || 
|-id=833 bgcolor=#E9E9E9
| 415833 ||  || — || September 7, 2001 || Socorro || LINEAR || — || align=right data-sort-value="0.98" | 980 m || 
|-id=834 bgcolor=#E9E9E9
| 415834 ||  || — || September 11, 2001 || Socorro || LINEAR || BRG || align=right | 1.9 km || 
|-id=835 bgcolor=#E9E9E9
| 415835 ||  || — || September 12, 2001 || Socorro || LINEAR || — || align=right | 1.4 km || 
|-id=836 bgcolor=#E9E9E9
| 415836 ||  || — || September 10, 2001 || Socorro || LINEAR || — || align=right | 1.8 km || 
|-id=837 bgcolor=#E9E9E9
| 415837 ||  || — || September 11, 2001 || Anderson Mesa || LONEOS || — || align=right | 1.2 km || 
|-id=838 bgcolor=#E9E9E9
| 415838 ||  || — || September 12, 2001 || Kitt Peak || Spacewatch || — || align=right | 1.1 km || 
|-id=839 bgcolor=#E9E9E9
| 415839 ||  || — || September 12, 2001 || Socorro || LINEAR || — || align=right | 1.1 km || 
|-id=840 bgcolor=#E9E9E9
| 415840 ||  || — || September 12, 2001 || Socorro || LINEAR || (5) || align=right data-sort-value="0.88" | 880 m || 
|-id=841 bgcolor=#FA8072
| 415841 ||  || — || September 11, 2001 || Anderson Mesa || LONEOS || — || align=right data-sort-value="0.62" | 620 m || 
|-id=842 bgcolor=#E9E9E9
| 415842 ||  || — || September 18, 2001 || Kitt Peak || Spacewatch || — || align=right data-sort-value="0.93" | 930 m || 
|-id=843 bgcolor=#E9E9E9
| 415843 ||  || — || September 16, 2001 || Socorro || LINEAR || — || align=right | 2.0 km || 
|-id=844 bgcolor=#E9E9E9
| 415844 ||  || — || September 17, 2001 || Socorro || LINEAR || — || align=right | 1.7 km || 
|-id=845 bgcolor=#E9E9E9
| 415845 ||  || — || September 17, 2001 || Socorro || LINEAR || — || align=right | 1.7 km || 
|-id=846 bgcolor=#E9E9E9
| 415846 ||  || — || September 17, 2001 || Socorro || LINEAR || — || align=right | 2.0 km || 
|-id=847 bgcolor=#E9E9E9
| 415847 ||  || — || September 19, 2001 || Anderson Mesa || LONEOS || RAF || align=right | 1.2 km || 
|-id=848 bgcolor=#E9E9E9
| 415848 ||  || — || September 19, 2001 || Socorro || LINEAR || — || align=right data-sort-value="0.96" | 960 m || 
|-id=849 bgcolor=#E9E9E9
| 415849 ||  || — || September 20, 2001 || Socorro || LINEAR || — || align=right | 1.1 km || 
|-id=850 bgcolor=#d6d6d6
| 415850 ||  || — || September 20, 2001 || Socorro || LINEAR || — || align=right | 4.4 km || 
|-id=851 bgcolor=#E9E9E9
| 415851 ||  || — || September 11, 2001 || Kitt Peak || Spacewatch || — || align=right | 1.0 km || 
|-id=852 bgcolor=#fefefe
| 415852 ||  || — || September 20, 2001 || Socorro || LINEAR || — || align=right data-sort-value="0.58" | 580 m || 
|-id=853 bgcolor=#E9E9E9
| 415853 ||  || — || September 20, 2001 || Socorro || LINEAR || — || align=right | 1.5 km || 
|-id=854 bgcolor=#E9E9E9
| 415854 ||  || — || September 12, 2001 || Kitt Peak || Spacewatch || — || align=right | 1.2 km || 
|-id=855 bgcolor=#E9E9E9
| 415855 ||  || — || September 11, 2001 || Anderson Mesa || LONEOS || — || align=right | 1.3 km || 
|-id=856 bgcolor=#E9E9E9
| 415856 ||  || — || September 16, 2001 || Socorro || LINEAR || — || align=right data-sort-value="0.94" | 940 m || 
|-id=857 bgcolor=#E9E9E9
| 415857 ||  || — || September 16, 2001 || Socorro || LINEAR || (5) || align=right data-sort-value="0.93" | 930 m || 
|-id=858 bgcolor=#fefefe
| 415858 ||  || — || September 16, 2001 || Socorro || LINEAR || — || align=right data-sort-value="0.68" | 680 m || 
|-id=859 bgcolor=#E9E9E9
| 415859 ||  || — || September 16, 2001 || Socorro || LINEAR || — || align=right | 1.8 km || 
|-id=860 bgcolor=#E9E9E9
| 415860 ||  || — || September 17, 2001 || Socorro || LINEAR || — || align=right | 1.6 km || 
|-id=861 bgcolor=#fefefe
| 415861 ||  || — || September 17, 2001 || Socorro || LINEAR || — || align=right data-sort-value="0.73" | 730 m || 
|-id=862 bgcolor=#E9E9E9
| 415862 ||  || — || September 17, 2001 || Socorro || LINEAR || EUN || align=right | 1.4 km || 
|-id=863 bgcolor=#E9E9E9
| 415863 ||  || — || September 17, 2001 || Socorro || LINEAR || — || align=right | 1.2 km || 
|-id=864 bgcolor=#E9E9E9
| 415864 ||  || — || September 16, 2001 || Socorro || LINEAR || (5) || align=right data-sort-value="0.84" | 840 m || 
|-id=865 bgcolor=#fefefe
| 415865 ||  || — || September 16, 2001 || Socorro || LINEAR || — || align=right data-sort-value="0.58" | 580 m || 
|-id=866 bgcolor=#d6d6d6
| 415866 ||  || — || September 19, 2001 || Socorro || LINEAR || — || align=right | 4.1 km || 
|-id=867 bgcolor=#d6d6d6
| 415867 ||  || — || September 19, 2001 || Socorro || LINEAR || — || align=right | 4.0 km || 
|-id=868 bgcolor=#d6d6d6
| 415868 ||  || — || September 19, 2001 || Socorro || LINEAR || — || align=right | 3.3 km || 
|-id=869 bgcolor=#E9E9E9
| 415869 ||  || — || September 25, 2001 || Desert Eagle || W. K. Y. Yeung || — || align=right | 1.5 km || 
|-id=870 bgcolor=#FA8072
| 415870 ||  || — || September 26, 2001 || Socorro || LINEAR || — || align=right | 1.8 km || 
|-id=871 bgcolor=#E9E9E9
| 415871 ||  || — || September 21, 2001 || Anderson Mesa || LONEOS || — || align=right | 1.6 km || 
|-id=872 bgcolor=#FA8072
| 415872 ||  || — || September 21, 2001 || Socorro || LINEAR || — || align=right data-sort-value="0.67" | 670 m || 
|-id=873 bgcolor=#E9E9E9
| 415873 ||  || — || September 19, 2001 || Socorro || LINEAR || — || align=right | 1.6 km || 
|-id=874 bgcolor=#E9E9E9
| 415874 ||  || — || September 8, 2001 || Socorro || LINEAR || (5) || align=right data-sort-value="0.84" | 840 m || 
|-id=875 bgcolor=#E9E9E9
| 415875 ||  || — || September 12, 2001 || Socorro || LINEAR || — || align=right | 1.0 km || 
|-id=876 bgcolor=#E9E9E9
| 415876 ||  || — || August 25, 2001 || Kitt Peak || Spacewatch || KON || align=right | 2.0 km || 
|-id=877 bgcolor=#E9E9E9
| 415877 ||  || — || September 20, 2001 || Socorro || LINEAR || — || align=right | 1.5 km || 
|-id=878 bgcolor=#E9E9E9
| 415878 ||  || — || September 25, 2001 || Socorro || LINEAR || EUN || align=right | 1.4 km || 
|-id=879 bgcolor=#E9E9E9
| 415879 ||  || — || September 16, 2001 || Socorro || LINEAR || — || align=right | 1.2 km || 
|-id=880 bgcolor=#E9E9E9
| 415880 ||  || — || September 19, 2001 || Kitt Peak || Spacewatch || — || align=right data-sort-value="0.85" | 850 m || 
|-id=881 bgcolor=#E9E9E9
| 415881 ||  || — || September 20, 2001 || Kitt Peak || Spacewatch || — || align=right | 1.0 km || 
|-id=882 bgcolor=#d6d6d6
| 415882 ||  || — || September 21, 2001 || Anderson Mesa || LONEOS || 7:4 || align=right | 3.9 km || 
|-id=883 bgcolor=#E9E9E9
| 415883 ||  || — || September 28, 2001 || Palomar || NEAT || (5) || align=right data-sort-value="0.87" | 870 m || 
|-id=884 bgcolor=#FA8072
| 415884 ||  || — || October 6, 2001 || Socorro || LINEAR || — || align=right | 2.0 km || 
|-id=885 bgcolor=#fefefe
| 415885 ||  || — || October 14, 2001 || Socorro || LINEAR || — || align=right data-sort-value="0.93" | 930 m || 
|-id=886 bgcolor=#E9E9E9
| 415886 ||  || — || October 14, 2001 || Socorro || LINEAR || — || align=right | 1.5 km || 
|-id=887 bgcolor=#E9E9E9
| 415887 ||  || — || October 14, 2001 || Socorro || LINEAR || — || align=right | 1.9 km || 
|-id=888 bgcolor=#E9E9E9
| 415888 ||  || — || October 13, 2001 || Socorro || LINEAR || — || align=right | 1.8 km || 
|-id=889 bgcolor=#E9E9E9
| 415889 ||  || — || October 14, 2001 || Socorro || LINEAR || — || align=right | 1.7 km || 
|-id=890 bgcolor=#E9E9E9
| 415890 ||  || — || October 14, 2001 || Socorro || LINEAR || — || align=right | 1.5 km || 
|-id=891 bgcolor=#E9E9E9
| 415891 ||  || — || October 14, 2001 || Socorro || LINEAR || BRG || align=right | 1.5 km || 
|-id=892 bgcolor=#E9E9E9
| 415892 ||  || — || October 14, 2001 || Socorro || LINEAR || — || align=right | 2.2 km || 
|-id=893 bgcolor=#E9E9E9
| 415893 ||  || — || October 14, 2001 || Socorro || LINEAR || — || align=right | 1.6 km || 
|-id=894 bgcolor=#E9E9E9
| 415894 ||  || — || October 10, 2001 || Palomar || NEAT || — || align=right | 1.2 km || 
|-id=895 bgcolor=#E9E9E9
| 415895 ||  || — || October 10, 2001 || Palomar || NEAT || — || align=right | 1.6 km || 
|-id=896 bgcolor=#E9E9E9
| 415896 ||  || — || October 14, 2001 || Socorro || LINEAR || — || align=right | 1.1 km || 
|-id=897 bgcolor=#E9E9E9
| 415897 ||  || — || October 14, 2001 || Socorro || LINEAR || — || align=right | 1.3 km || 
|-id=898 bgcolor=#E9E9E9
| 415898 ||  || — || October 14, 2001 || Socorro || LINEAR || — || align=right | 1.9 km || 
|-id=899 bgcolor=#E9E9E9
| 415899 ||  || — || October 11, 2001 || Socorro || LINEAR || (5) || align=right data-sort-value="0.94" | 940 m || 
|-id=900 bgcolor=#E9E9E9
| 415900 ||  || — || October 11, 2001 || Socorro || LINEAR || — || align=right | 1.3 km || 
|}

415901–416000 

|-bgcolor=#E9E9E9
| 415901 ||  || — || October 13, 2001 || Palomar || NEAT || — || align=right | 1.8 km || 
|-id=902 bgcolor=#E9E9E9
| 415902 ||  || — || October 14, 2001 || Anderson Mesa || LONEOS || — || align=right | 1.5 km || 
|-id=903 bgcolor=#E9E9E9
| 415903 ||  || — || October 14, 2001 || Socorro || LINEAR || — || align=right | 1.0 km || 
|-id=904 bgcolor=#E9E9E9
| 415904 ||  || — || October 15, 2001 || Haleakala || NEAT || — || align=right | 1.6 km || 
|-id=905 bgcolor=#E9E9E9
| 415905 ||  || — || October 12, 2001 || Palomar || NEAT || EUN || align=right | 1.0 km || 
|-id=906 bgcolor=#E9E9E9
| 415906 ||  || — || May 13, 2012 || Mount Lemmon || Mount Lemmon Survey || — || align=right | 1.3 km || 
|-id=907 bgcolor=#E9E9E9
| 415907 ||  || — || September 10, 2001 || Anderson Mesa || LONEOS || (1547) || align=right | 1.9 km || 
|-id=908 bgcolor=#E9E9E9
| 415908 ||  || — || October 18, 2001 || Socorro || LINEAR || — || align=right | 2.1 km || 
|-id=909 bgcolor=#E9E9E9
| 415909 ||  || — || October 16, 2001 || Socorro || LINEAR || — || align=right | 1.4 km || 
|-id=910 bgcolor=#E9E9E9
| 415910 ||  || — || October 16, 2001 || Socorro || LINEAR || — || align=right | 1.2 km || 
|-id=911 bgcolor=#E9E9E9
| 415911 ||  || — || October 17, 2001 || Socorro || LINEAR || — || align=right | 1.8 km || 
|-id=912 bgcolor=#E9E9E9
| 415912 ||  || — || October 17, 2001 || Socorro || LINEAR || — || align=right | 1.2 km || 
|-id=913 bgcolor=#FA8072
| 415913 ||  || — || October 18, 2001 || Socorro || LINEAR || — || align=right data-sort-value="0.64" | 640 m || 
|-id=914 bgcolor=#E9E9E9
| 415914 ||  || — || September 20, 2001 || Socorro || LINEAR || — || align=right | 1.8 km || 
|-id=915 bgcolor=#fefefe
| 415915 ||  || — || October 20, 2001 || Socorro || LINEAR || — || align=right data-sort-value="0.89" | 890 m || 
|-id=916 bgcolor=#fefefe
| 415916 ||  || — || October 20, 2001 || Socorro || LINEAR || — || align=right data-sort-value="0.80" | 800 m || 
|-id=917 bgcolor=#fefefe
| 415917 ||  || — || October 23, 2001 || Socorro || LINEAR || — || align=right data-sort-value="0.62" | 620 m || 
|-id=918 bgcolor=#E9E9E9
| 415918 ||  || — || October 23, 2001 || Socorro || LINEAR || — || align=right | 1.5 km || 
|-id=919 bgcolor=#E9E9E9
| 415919 ||  || — || October 23, 2001 || Socorro || LINEAR || — || align=right | 1.3 km || 
|-id=920 bgcolor=#E9E9E9
| 415920 ||  || — || October 23, 2001 || Socorro || LINEAR || JUN || align=right | 1.0 km || 
|-id=921 bgcolor=#E9E9E9
| 415921 ||  || — || October 23, 2001 || Socorro || LINEAR || — || align=right | 1.5 km || 
|-id=922 bgcolor=#E9E9E9
| 415922 ||  || — || October 17, 2001 || Kitt Peak || Spacewatch || — || align=right | 1.4 km || 
|-id=923 bgcolor=#E9E9E9
| 415923 ||  || — || September 19, 2001 || Kitt Peak || Spacewatch || — || align=right data-sort-value="0.99" | 990 m || 
|-id=924 bgcolor=#fefefe
| 415924 ||  || — || October 19, 2001 || Palomar || NEAT || — || align=right data-sort-value="0.51" | 510 m || 
|-id=925 bgcolor=#E9E9E9
| 415925 ||  || — || October 21, 2001 || Socorro || LINEAR || — || align=right | 1.4 km || 
|-id=926 bgcolor=#E9E9E9
| 415926 ||  || — || October 23, 2001 || Socorro || LINEAR || — || align=right | 1.1 km || 
|-id=927 bgcolor=#fefefe
| 415927 ||  || — || October 23, 2001 || Socorro || LINEAR || H || align=right data-sort-value="0.57" | 570 m || 
|-id=928 bgcolor=#E9E9E9
| 415928 ||  || — || October 16, 2001 || Palomar || NEAT || — || align=right | 1.5 km || 
|-id=929 bgcolor=#E9E9E9
| 415929 ||  || — || November 9, 2001 || Socorro || LINEAR || — || align=right | 2.0 km || 
|-id=930 bgcolor=#E9E9E9
| 415930 ||  || — || November 10, 2001 || Socorro || LINEAR || — || align=right | 1.8 km || 
|-id=931 bgcolor=#E9E9E9
| 415931 ||  || — || November 10, 2001 || Socorro || LINEAR || MAR || align=right | 1.7 km || 
|-id=932 bgcolor=#E9E9E9
| 415932 ||  || — || November 11, 2001 || Socorro || LINEAR || JUN || align=right | 1.5 km || 
|-id=933 bgcolor=#fefefe
| 415933 ||  || — || November 11, 2001 || Socorro || LINEAR || H || align=right data-sort-value="0.72" | 720 m || 
|-id=934 bgcolor=#E9E9E9
| 415934 ||  || — || November 12, 2001 || Socorro || LINEAR || EUN || align=right | 1.3 km || 
|-id=935 bgcolor=#E9E9E9
| 415935 ||  || — || November 12, 2001 || Socorro || LINEAR || — || align=right | 1.4 km || 
|-id=936 bgcolor=#E9E9E9
| 415936 ||  || — || November 18, 2001 || Haleakala || NEAT || — || align=right | 1.9 km || 
|-id=937 bgcolor=#E9E9E9
| 415937 ||  || — || November 17, 2001 || Socorro || LINEAR || — || align=right | 1.3 km || 
|-id=938 bgcolor=#E9E9E9
| 415938 ||  || — || November 17, 2001 || Socorro || LINEAR || — || align=right | 1.5 km || 
|-id=939 bgcolor=#E9E9E9
| 415939 ||  || — || November 17, 2001 || Socorro || LINEAR || — || align=right | 1.2 km || 
|-id=940 bgcolor=#E9E9E9
| 415940 ||  || — || November 18, 2001 || Socorro || LINEAR || — || align=right | 1.5 km || 
|-id=941 bgcolor=#E9E9E9
| 415941 ||  || — || November 17, 2001 || Socorro || LINEAR || — || align=right | 2.9 km || 
|-id=942 bgcolor=#E9E9E9
| 415942 ||  || — || November 18, 2001 || Socorro || LINEAR || — || align=right | 1.8 km || 
|-id=943 bgcolor=#E9E9E9
| 415943 ||  || — || November 19, 2001 || Socorro || LINEAR || — || align=right | 1.8 km || 
|-id=944 bgcolor=#E9E9E9
| 415944 ||  || — || November 19, 2001 || Socorro || LINEAR || — || align=right | 1.5 km || 
|-id=945 bgcolor=#E9E9E9
| 415945 ||  || — || November 21, 2001 || Socorro || LINEAR || ADE || align=right | 2.8 km || 
|-id=946 bgcolor=#E9E9E9
| 415946 ||  || — || November 20, 2001 || Kitt Peak || Spacewatch || — || align=right | 1.4 km || 
|-id=947 bgcolor=#E9E9E9
| 415947 ||  || — || November 18, 2001 || Haleakala || NEAT || — || align=right | 1.6 km || 
|-id=948 bgcolor=#E9E9E9
| 415948 ||  || — || November 18, 2001 || Kitt Peak || Spacewatch || — || align=right | 1.5 km || 
|-id=949 bgcolor=#FFC2E0
| 415949 ||  || — || December 11, 2001 || Socorro || LINEAR || ATE || align=right data-sort-value="0.50" | 500 m || 
|-id=950 bgcolor=#E9E9E9
| 415950 ||  || — || December 9, 2001 || Socorro || LINEAR || JUN || align=right | 1.3 km || 
|-id=951 bgcolor=#E9E9E9
| 415951 ||  || — || December 9, 2001 || Socorro || LINEAR || (1547) || align=right | 1.8 km || 
|-id=952 bgcolor=#fefefe
| 415952 ||  || — || December 11, 2001 || Socorro || LINEAR || H || align=right data-sort-value="0.88" | 880 m || 
|-id=953 bgcolor=#FA8072
| 415953 ||  || — || December 11, 2001 || Socorro || LINEAR || H || align=right data-sort-value="0.81" | 810 m || 
|-id=954 bgcolor=#E9E9E9
| 415954 ||  || — || December 9, 2001 || Socorro || LINEAR || — || align=right | 1.8 km || 
|-id=955 bgcolor=#E9E9E9
| 415955 ||  || — || December 9, 2001 || Socorro || LINEAR || — || align=right | 5.2 km || 
|-id=956 bgcolor=#E9E9E9
| 415956 ||  || — || December 11, 2001 || Socorro || LINEAR || — || align=right | 1.5 km || 
|-id=957 bgcolor=#E9E9E9
| 415957 ||  || — || December 11, 2001 || Socorro || LINEAR || — || align=right | 2.0 km || 
|-id=958 bgcolor=#fefefe
| 415958 ||  || — || November 21, 2001 || Socorro || LINEAR || H || align=right data-sort-value="0.88" | 880 m || 
|-id=959 bgcolor=#E9E9E9
| 415959 ||  || — || October 10, 2001 || Palomar || NEAT || — || align=right | 1.6 km || 
|-id=960 bgcolor=#E9E9E9
| 415960 ||  || — || December 11, 2001 || Socorro || LINEAR || JUN || align=right | 1.5 km || 
|-id=961 bgcolor=#E9E9E9
| 415961 ||  || — || December 14, 2001 || Socorro || LINEAR || — || align=right | 1.7 km || 
|-id=962 bgcolor=#E9E9E9
| 415962 ||  || — || December 14, 2001 || Socorro || LINEAR || EUN || align=right | 1.4 km || 
|-id=963 bgcolor=#E9E9E9
| 415963 ||  || — || November 17, 2001 || Kitt Peak || Spacewatch || — || align=right | 1.6 km || 
|-id=964 bgcolor=#E9E9E9
| 415964 ||  || — || December 14, 2001 || Socorro || LINEAR || — || align=right | 1.8 km || 
|-id=965 bgcolor=#E9E9E9
| 415965 ||  || — || December 11, 2001 || Socorro || LINEAR || — || align=right | 1.9 km || 
|-id=966 bgcolor=#E9E9E9
| 415966 ||  || — || December 13, 2001 || Socorro || LINEAR || — || align=right | 2.8 km || 
|-id=967 bgcolor=#E9E9E9
| 415967 ||  || — || November 12, 2001 || Socorro || LINEAR || — || align=right | 2.0 km || 
|-id=968 bgcolor=#E9E9E9
| 415968 ||  || — || October 15, 2001 || Socorro || LINEAR || — || align=right | 1.5 km || 
|-id=969 bgcolor=#E9E9E9
| 415969 ||  || — || December 15, 2001 || Socorro || LINEAR || — || align=right | 1.7 km || 
|-id=970 bgcolor=#E9E9E9
| 415970 ||  || — || December 15, 2001 || Socorro || LINEAR || — || align=right | 2.4 km || 
|-id=971 bgcolor=#E9E9E9
| 415971 ||  || — || December 15, 2001 || Socorro || LINEAR || (194) || align=right | 1.8 km || 
|-id=972 bgcolor=#E9E9E9
| 415972 ||  || — || December 14, 2001 || Kitt Peak || Spacewatch || — || align=right | 1.2 km || 
|-id=973 bgcolor=#E9E9E9
| 415973 ||  || — || November 9, 2001 || Socorro || LINEAR || — || align=right | 2.1 km || 
|-id=974 bgcolor=#FA8072
| 415974 ||  || — || December 18, 2001 || Socorro || LINEAR || H || align=right data-sort-value="0.94" | 940 m || 
|-id=975 bgcolor=#FA8072
| 415975 ||  || — || December 17, 2001 || Socorro || LINEAR || — || align=right | 1.1 km || 
|-id=976 bgcolor=#E9E9E9
| 415976 ||  || — || December 18, 2001 || Socorro || LINEAR || — || align=right | 1.8 km || 
|-id=977 bgcolor=#E9E9E9
| 415977 ||  || — || December 18, 2001 || Socorro || LINEAR || — || align=right | 4.0 km || 
|-id=978 bgcolor=#E9E9E9
| 415978 ||  || — || December 18, 2001 || Socorro || LINEAR || ADE || align=right | 2.6 km || 
|-id=979 bgcolor=#E9E9E9
| 415979 ||  || — || December 18, 2001 || Socorro || LINEAR || — || align=right | 2.7 km || 
|-id=980 bgcolor=#FA8072
| 415980 ||  || — || December 17, 2001 || Palomar || NEAT || — || align=right data-sort-value="0.94" | 940 m || 
|-id=981 bgcolor=#E9E9E9
| 415981 ||  || — || December 17, 2001 || Socorro || LINEAR || — || align=right | 1.2 km || 
|-id=982 bgcolor=#E9E9E9
| 415982 ||  || — || December 17, 2001 || Socorro || LINEAR || — || align=right | 1.3 km || 
|-id=983 bgcolor=#fefefe
| 415983 ||  || — || December 17, 2001 || Socorro || LINEAR || H || align=right data-sort-value="0.85" | 850 m || 
|-id=984 bgcolor=#E9E9E9
| 415984 ||  || — || December 22, 2001 || Socorro || LINEAR || — || align=right | 3.5 km || 
|-id=985 bgcolor=#E9E9E9
| 415985 ||  || — || December 17, 2001 || Socorro || LINEAR || — || align=right | 1.9 km || 
|-id=986 bgcolor=#FFC2E0
| 415986 ||  || — || January 9, 2002 || Socorro || LINEAR || AMO +1kmcritical || align=right | 1.1 km || 
|-id=987 bgcolor=#FFC2E0
| 415987 ||  || — || January 11, 2002 || Socorro || LINEAR || APO || align=right data-sort-value="0.55" | 550 m || 
|-id=988 bgcolor=#fefefe
| 415988 ||  || — || January 12, 2002 || Socorro || LINEAR || H || align=right data-sort-value="0.87" | 870 m || 
|-id=989 bgcolor=#E9E9E9
| 415989 ||  || — || January 6, 2002 || Socorro || LINEAR || — || align=right | 2.1 km || 
|-id=990 bgcolor=#E9E9E9
| 415990 ||  || — || January 9, 2002 || Socorro || LINEAR || — || align=right | 1.5 km || 
|-id=991 bgcolor=#E9E9E9
| 415991 ||  || — || January 9, 2002 || Socorro || LINEAR || — || align=right | 1.3 km || 
|-id=992 bgcolor=#E9E9E9
| 415992 ||  || — || January 9, 2002 || Socorro || LINEAR || GEF || align=right | 1.5 km || 
|-id=993 bgcolor=#E9E9E9
| 415993 ||  || — || December 18, 2001 || Socorro || LINEAR || — || align=right | 2.8 km || 
|-id=994 bgcolor=#E9E9E9
| 415994 ||  || — || January 11, 2002 || Socorro || LINEAR || — || align=right | 2.1 km || 
|-id=995 bgcolor=#E9E9E9
| 415995 ||  || — || January 15, 2002 || Socorro || LINEAR || — || align=right | 1.9 km || 
|-id=996 bgcolor=#FA8072
| 415996 ||  || — || January 8, 2002 || Socorro || LINEAR || — || align=right | 1.6 km || 
|-id=997 bgcolor=#E9E9E9
| 415997 ||  || — || January 9, 2002 || Socorro || LINEAR || — || align=right | 1.5 km || 
|-id=998 bgcolor=#E9E9E9
| 415998 ||  || — || January 9, 2002 || Socorro || LINEAR || — || align=right | 1.9 km || 
|-id=999 bgcolor=#E9E9E9
| 415999 ||  || — || January 9, 2002 || Socorro || LINEAR || — || align=right | 2.0 km || 
|-id=000 bgcolor=#E9E9E9
| 416000 ||  || — || January 14, 2002 || Socorro || LINEAR || — || align=right | 2.4 km || 
|}

References

External links 
 Discovery Circumstances: Numbered Minor Planets (415001)–(420000) (IAU Minor Planet Center)

0415